

46001–46100 

|-bgcolor=#fefefe
| 46001 ||  || — || February 1, 2001 || Socorro || LINEAR || — || align=right | 1.8 km || 
|-id=002 bgcolor=#fefefe
| 46002 ||  || — || February 1, 2001 || Socorro || LINEAR || V || align=right | 1.6 km || 
|-id=003 bgcolor=#fefefe
| 46003 ||  || — || February 1, 2001 || Socorro || LINEAR || FLO || align=right | 1.6 km || 
|-id=004 bgcolor=#fefefe
| 46004 ||  || — || February 1, 2001 || Socorro || LINEAR || — || align=right | 3.7 km || 
|-id=005 bgcolor=#E9E9E9
| 46005 ||  || — || February 1, 2001 || Socorro || LINEAR || — || align=right | 7.0 km || 
|-id=006 bgcolor=#fefefe
| 46006 ||  || — || February 1, 2001 || Socorro || LINEAR || NYS || align=right | 1.7 km || 
|-id=007 bgcolor=#fefefe
| 46007 ||  || — || February 1, 2001 || Socorro || LINEAR || — || align=right | 1.8 km || 
|-id=008 bgcolor=#E9E9E9
| 46008 ||  || — || February 1, 2001 || Socorro || LINEAR || EUN || align=right | 6.0 km || 
|-id=009 bgcolor=#fefefe
| 46009 ||  || — || February 1, 2001 || Socorro || LINEAR || FLO || align=right | 1.7 km || 
|-id=010 bgcolor=#E9E9E9
| 46010 ||  || — || February 1, 2001 || Socorro || LINEAR || — || align=right | 2.0 km || 
|-id=011 bgcolor=#E9E9E9
| 46011 ||  || — || February 2, 2001 || Socorro || LINEAR || AGN || align=right | 2.9 km || 
|-id=012 bgcolor=#d6d6d6
| 46012 ||  || — || February 1, 2001 || Socorro || LINEAR || — || align=right | 7.5 km || 
|-id=013 bgcolor=#d6d6d6
| 46013 ||  || — || February 1, 2001 || Socorro || LINEAR || EOS || align=right | 5.3 km || 
|-id=014 bgcolor=#fefefe
| 46014 ||  || — || February 2, 2001 || Anderson Mesa || LONEOS || — || align=right | 4.2 km || 
|-id=015 bgcolor=#fefefe
| 46015 ||  || — || February 15, 2001 || Oizumi || T. Kobayashi || V || align=right | 2.0 km || 
|-id=016 bgcolor=#fefefe
| 46016 ||  || — || February 15, 2001 || Črni Vrh || Črni Vrh || — || align=right | 1.9 km || 
|-id=017 bgcolor=#d6d6d6
| 46017 ||  || — || February 16, 2001 || Socorro || LINEAR || — || align=right | 7.0 km || 
|-id=018 bgcolor=#E9E9E9
| 46018 ||  || — || February 16, 2001 || Črni Vrh || Črni Vrh || HEN || align=right | 2.7 km || 
|-id=019 bgcolor=#E9E9E9
| 46019 ||  || — || February 16, 2001 || Socorro || LINEAR || — || align=right | 3.1 km || 
|-id=020 bgcolor=#fefefe
| 46020 ||  || — || February 17, 2001 || Socorro || LINEAR || — || align=right | 1.8 km || 
|-id=021 bgcolor=#fefefe
| 46021 ||  || — || February 17, 2001 || Črni Vrh || Črni Vrh || — || align=right | 2.4 km || 
|-id=022 bgcolor=#E9E9E9
| 46022 ||  || — || February 16, 2001 || Socorro || LINEAR || — || align=right | 2.9 km || 
|-id=023 bgcolor=#fefefe
| 46023 ||  || — || February 16, 2001 || Socorro || LINEAR || — || align=right | 2.2 km || 
|-id=024 bgcolor=#d6d6d6
| 46024 ||  || — || February 16, 2001 || Socorro || LINEAR || — || align=right | 10 km || 
|-id=025 bgcolor=#E9E9E9
| 46025 ||  || — || February 16, 2001 || Socorro || LINEAR || — || align=right | 2.5 km || 
|-id=026 bgcolor=#E9E9E9
| 46026 ||  || — || February 16, 2001 || Socorro || LINEAR || — || align=right | 3.1 km || 
|-id=027 bgcolor=#E9E9E9
| 46027 ||  || — || February 16, 2001 || Socorro || LINEAR || — || align=right | 8.2 km || 
|-id=028 bgcolor=#E9E9E9
| 46028 ||  || — || February 16, 2001 || Socorro || LINEAR || — || align=right | 3.1 km || 
|-id=029 bgcolor=#E9E9E9
| 46029 ||  || — || February 16, 2001 || Socorro || LINEAR || EUN || align=right | 2.8 km || 
|-id=030 bgcolor=#fefefe
| 46030 ||  || — || February 17, 2001 || Socorro || LINEAR || NYS || align=right | 2.0 km || 
|-id=031 bgcolor=#fefefe
| 46031 ||  || — || February 17, 2001 || Socorro || LINEAR || NYS || align=right | 1.9 km || 
|-id=032 bgcolor=#fefefe
| 46032 ||  || — || February 17, 2001 || Socorro || LINEAR || — || align=right | 1.7 km || 
|-id=033 bgcolor=#E9E9E9
| 46033 ||  || — || February 17, 2001 || Socorro || LINEAR || — || align=right | 3.0 km || 
|-id=034 bgcolor=#fefefe
| 46034 ||  || — || February 17, 2001 || Socorro || LINEAR || — || align=right | 4.7 km || 
|-id=035 bgcolor=#fefefe
| 46035 ||  || — || February 17, 2001 || Socorro || LINEAR || V || align=right | 1.5 km || 
|-id=036 bgcolor=#fefefe
| 46036 ||  || — || February 17, 2001 || Socorro || LINEAR || — || align=right | 1.6 km || 
|-id=037 bgcolor=#E9E9E9
| 46037 ||  || — || February 17, 2001 || Socorro || LINEAR || PAL || align=right | 6.9 km || 
|-id=038 bgcolor=#fefefe
| 46038 ||  || — || February 17, 2001 || Socorro || LINEAR || — || align=right | 1.9 km || 
|-id=039 bgcolor=#fefefe
| 46039 ||  || — || February 19, 2001 || Socorro || LINEAR || V || align=right | 2.0 km || 
|-id=040 bgcolor=#d6d6d6
| 46040 ||  || — || February 19, 2001 || Socorro || LINEAR || THM || align=right | 7.5 km || 
|-id=041 bgcolor=#E9E9E9
| 46041 ||  || — || February 19, 2001 || Socorro || LINEAR || EUN || align=right | 3.0 km || 
|-id=042 bgcolor=#fefefe
| 46042 ||  || — || February 21, 2001 || Desert Beaver || W. K. Y. Yeung || V || align=right | 1.7 km || 
|-id=043 bgcolor=#E9E9E9
| 46043 ||  || — || February 19, 2001 || Socorro || LINEAR || — || align=right | 3.2 km || 
|-id=044 bgcolor=#E9E9E9
| 46044 ||  || — || February 19, 2001 || Socorro || LINEAR || — || align=right | 3.2 km || 
|-id=045 bgcolor=#d6d6d6
| 46045 ||  || — || February 19, 2001 || Socorro || LINEAR || — || align=right | 9.3 km || 
|-id=046 bgcolor=#fefefe
| 46046 ||  || — || February 19, 2001 || Socorro || LINEAR || V || align=right | 1.6 km || 
|-id=047 bgcolor=#d6d6d6
| 46047 ||  || — || February 19, 2001 || Socorro || LINEAR || — || align=right | 7.0 km || 
|-id=048 bgcolor=#fefefe
| 46048 ||  || — || February 19, 2001 || Socorro || LINEAR || NYS || align=right | 2.0 km || 
|-id=049 bgcolor=#fefefe
| 46049 ||  || — || February 19, 2001 || Socorro || LINEAR || — || align=right | 3.9 km || 
|-id=050 bgcolor=#d6d6d6
| 46050 ||  || — || February 19, 2001 || Socorro || LINEAR || — || align=right | 6.7 km || 
|-id=051 bgcolor=#E9E9E9
| 46051 ||  || — || February 19, 2001 || Socorro || LINEAR || — || align=right | 2.8 km || 
|-id=052 bgcolor=#fefefe
| 46052 ||  || — || February 20, 2001 || Socorro || LINEAR || — || align=right | 2.1 km || 
|-id=053 bgcolor=#fefefe
| 46053 Davidpatterson ||  ||  || February 21, 2001 || Junk Bond || D. Healy || — || align=right | 1.5 km || 
|-id=054 bgcolor=#d6d6d6
| 46054 ||  || — || February 22, 2001 || Haleakala || NEAT || — || align=right | 6.6 km || 
|-id=055 bgcolor=#E9E9E9
| 46055 ||  || — || February 22, 2001 || Kitt Peak || Spacewatch || — || align=right | 2.5 km || 
|-id=056 bgcolor=#E9E9E9
| 46056 ||  || — || February 23, 2001 || Haleakala || NEAT || — || align=right | 3.7 km || 
|-id=057 bgcolor=#E9E9E9
| 46057 ||  || — || February 21, 2001 || Anderson Mesa || LONEOS || — || align=right | 3.0 km || 
|-id=058 bgcolor=#E9E9E9
| 46058 ||  || — || February 24, 2001 || Haleakala || NEAT || EUN || align=right | 2.5 km || 
|-id=059 bgcolor=#fefefe
| 46059 ||  || — || February 25, 2001 || Haleakala || NEAT || — || align=right | 2.0 km || 
|-id=060 bgcolor=#d6d6d6
| 46060 ||  || — || February 26, 2001 || Cerro Tololo || DLS || — || align=right | 4.0 km || 
|-id=061 bgcolor=#E9E9E9
| 46061 ||  || — || February 22, 2001 || Socorro || LINEAR || — || align=right | 3.0 km || 
|-id=062 bgcolor=#E9E9E9
| 46062 ||  || — || February 20, 2001 || Haleakala || NEAT || ADE || align=right | 8.2 km || 
|-id=063 bgcolor=#fefefe
| 46063 ||  || — || February 20, 2001 || Kitt Peak || Spacewatch || — || align=right | 2.6 km || 
|-id=064 bgcolor=#d6d6d6
| 46064 ||  || — || February 20, 2001 || Haleakala || NEAT || MEL || align=right | 6.5 km || 
|-id=065 bgcolor=#fefefe
| 46065 ||  || — || February 19, 2001 || Anderson Mesa || LONEOS || V || align=right | 1.4 km || 
|-id=066 bgcolor=#fefefe
| 46066 ||  || — || February 17, 2001 || Socorro || LINEAR || NYS || align=right | 1.8 km || 
|-id=067 bgcolor=#d6d6d6
| 46067 ||  || — || February 17, 2001 || Socorro || LINEAR || — || align=right | 9.9 km || 
|-id=068 bgcolor=#fefefe
| 46068 ||  || — || February 16, 2001 || Kitt Peak || Spacewatch || — || align=right | 1.4 km || 
|-id=069 bgcolor=#fefefe
| 46069 ||  || — || February 16, 2001 || Socorro || LINEAR || — || align=right | 2.5 km || 
|-id=070 bgcolor=#fefefe
| 46070 ||  || — || February 16, 2001 || Socorro || LINEAR || — || align=right | 2.0 km || 
|-id=071 bgcolor=#d6d6d6
| 46071 ||  || — || February 16, 2001 || Haleakala || NEAT || — || align=right | 6.5 km || 
|-id=072 bgcolor=#d6d6d6
| 46072 || 2001 EJ || — || March 2, 2001 || Desert Beaver || W. K. Y. Yeung || — || align=right | 11 km || 
|-id=073 bgcolor=#fefefe
| 46073 ||  || — || March 1, 2001 || Socorro || LINEAR || V || align=right | 1.8 km || 
|-id=074 bgcolor=#E9E9E9
| 46074 ||  || — || March 1, 2001 || Socorro || LINEAR || CLO || align=right | 7.1 km || 
|-id=075 bgcolor=#fefefe
| 46075 ||  || — || March 2, 2001 || Anderson Mesa || LONEOS || — || align=right | 2.3 km || 
|-id=076 bgcolor=#E9E9E9
| 46076 Robertschottland ||  ||  || March 2, 2001 || Anderson Mesa || LONEOS || HOF || align=right | 6.3 km || 
|-id=077 bgcolor=#d6d6d6
| 46077 ||  || — || March 2, 2001 || Anderson Mesa || LONEOS || — || align=right | 5.4 km || 
|-id=078 bgcolor=#E9E9E9
| 46078 ||  || — || March 2, 2001 || Anderson Mesa || LONEOS || — || align=right | 3.4 km || 
|-id=079 bgcolor=#fefefe
| 46079 ||  || — || March 2, 2001 || Anderson Mesa || LONEOS || — || align=right | 4.4 km || 
|-id=080 bgcolor=#E9E9E9
| 46080 ||  || — || March 2, 2001 || Anderson Mesa || LONEOS || — || align=right | 2.7 km || 
|-id=081 bgcolor=#E9E9E9
| 46081 ||  || — || March 2, 2001 || Anderson Mesa || LONEOS || — || align=right | 6.8 km || 
|-id=082 bgcolor=#E9E9E9
| 46082 ||  || — || March 2, 2001 || Anderson Mesa || LONEOS || — || align=right | 3.6 km || 
|-id=083 bgcolor=#E9E9E9
| 46083 Aaronkingery ||  ||  || March 2, 2001 || Anderson Mesa || LONEOS || CLO || align=right | 8.0 km || 
|-id=084 bgcolor=#d6d6d6
| 46084 ||  || — || March 2, 2001 || Haleakala || NEAT || — || align=right | 4.6 km || 
|-id=085 bgcolor=#E9E9E9
| 46085 ||  || — || March 2, 2001 || Haleakala || NEAT || MAR || align=right | 3.0 km || 
|-id=086 bgcolor=#d6d6d6
| 46086 ||  || — || March 2, 2001 || Haleakala || NEAT || — || align=right | 8.3 km || 
|-id=087 bgcolor=#E9E9E9
| 46087 ||  || — || March 2, 2001 || Haleakala || NEAT || EUN || align=right | 4.9 km || 
|-id=088 bgcolor=#d6d6d6
| 46088 ||  || — || March 4, 2001 || Socorro || LINEAR || — || align=right | 9.5 km || 
|-id=089 bgcolor=#E9E9E9
| 46089 ||  || — || March 15, 2001 || Socorro || LINEAR || — || align=right | 3.8 km || 
|-id=090 bgcolor=#fefefe
| 46090 ||  || — || March 15, 2001 || Kitt Peak || Spacewatch || FLO || align=right | 1.9 km || 
|-id=091 bgcolor=#E9E9E9
| 46091 ||  || — || March 15, 2001 || Oizumi || T. Kobayashi || — || align=right | 5.7 km || 
|-id=092 bgcolor=#E9E9E9
| 46092 ||  || — || March 15, 2001 || Haleakala || NEAT || — || align=right | 3.2 km || 
|-id=093 bgcolor=#E9E9E9
| 46093 ||  || — || March 15, 2001 || Socorro || LINEAR || BRU || align=right | 7.7 km || 
|-id=094 bgcolor=#d6d6d6
| 46094 ||  || — || March 15, 2001 || Anderson Mesa || LONEOS || — || align=right | 7.0 km || 
|-id=095 bgcolor=#d6d6d6
| 46095 Frédérickoby ||  ||  || March 15, 2001 || Vicques || Jura Obs. || — || align=right | 6.8 km || 
|-id=096 bgcolor=#fefefe
| 46096 || 2001 FB || — || March 16, 2001 || Socorro || LINEAR || H || align=right | 2.0 km || 
|-id=097 bgcolor=#fefefe
| 46097 ||  || — || March 19, 2001 || Reedy Creek || J. Broughton || V || align=right | 2.5 km || 
|-id=098 bgcolor=#fefefe
| 46098 ||  || — || March 18, 2001 || Socorro || LINEAR || FLO || align=right | 1.3 km || 
|-id=099 bgcolor=#fefefe
| 46099 ||  || — || March 18, 2001 || Socorro || LINEAR || PHO || align=right | 3.2 km || 
|-id=100 bgcolor=#d6d6d6
| 46100 ||  || — || March 19, 2001 || Socorro || LINEAR || — || align=right | 6.3 km || 
|}

46101–46200 

|-bgcolor=#d6d6d6
| 46101 ||  || — || March 18, 2001 || Socorro || LINEAR || — || align=right | 11 km || 
|-id=102 bgcolor=#d6d6d6
| 46102 ||  || — || March 19, 2001 || Anderson Mesa || LONEOS || EOS || align=right | 5.5 km || 
|-id=103 bgcolor=#E9E9E9
| 46103 ||  || — || March 19, 2001 || Anderson Mesa || LONEOS || HEN || align=right | 7.1 km || 
|-id=104 bgcolor=#d6d6d6
| 46104 ||  || — || March 19, 2001 || Anderson Mesa || LONEOS || — || align=right | 6.3 km || 
|-id=105 bgcolor=#d6d6d6
| 46105 ||  || — || March 19, 2001 || Anderson Mesa || LONEOS || VER || align=right | 6.4 km || 
|-id=106 bgcolor=#fefefe
| 46106 ||  || — || March 19, 2001 || Anderson Mesa || LONEOS || — || align=right | 2.2 km || 
|-id=107 bgcolor=#fefefe
| 46107 ||  || — || March 19, 2001 || Anderson Mesa || LONEOS || V || align=right | 2.1 km || 
|-id=108 bgcolor=#fefefe
| 46108 ||  || — || March 19, 2001 || Anderson Mesa || LONEOS || — || align=right | 2.3 km || 
|-id=109 bgcolor=#d6d6d6
| 46109 ||  || — || March 21, 2001 || Anderson Mesa || LONEOS || — || align=right | 10 km || 
|-id=110 bgcolor=#fefefe
| 46110 Altheamoorhead ||  ||  || March 21, 2001 || Anderson Mesa || LONEOS || FLO || align=right | 1.8 km || 
|-id=111 bgcolor=#E9E9E9
| 46111 ||  || — || March 17, 2001 || Socorro || LINEAR || EUN || align=right | 4.0 km || 
|-id=112 bgcolor=#E9E9E9
| 46112 ||  || — || March 18, 2001 || Socorro || LINEAR || — || align=right | 7.5 km || 
|-id=113 bgcolor=#E9E9E9
| 46113 ||  || — || March 18, 2001 || Haleakala || NEAT || MAR || align=right | 3.5 km || 
|-id=114 bgcolor=#E9E9E9
| 46114 ||  || — || March 20, 2001 || Haleakala || NEAT || INO || align=right | 3.5 km || 
|-id=115 bgcolor=#d6d6d6
| 46115 ||  || — || March 18, 2001 || Socorro || LINEAR || EOS || align=right | 6.2 km || 
|-id=116 bgcolor=#fefefe
| 46116 ||  || — || March 18, 2001 || Socorro || LINEAR || FLO || align=right | 3.1 km || 
|-id=117 bgcolor=#fefefe
| 46117 ||  || — || March 18, 2001 || Socorro || LINEAR || V || align=right | 1.4 km || 
|-id=118 bgcolor=#fefefe
| 46118 ||  || — || March 18, 2001 || Socorro || LINEAR || — || align=right | 2.4 km || 
|-id=119 bgcolor=#fefefe
| 46119 ||  || — || March 18, 2001 || Socorro || LINEAR || NYS || align=right | 2.7 km || 
|-id=120 bgcolor=#fefefe
| 46120 ||  || — || March 18, 2001 || Socorro || LINEAR || — || align=right | 2.6 km || 
|-id=121 bgcolor=#E9E9E9
| 46121 ||  || — || March 18, 2001 || Socorro || LINEAR || — || align=right | 6.3 km || 
|-id=122 bgcolor=#E9E9E9
| 46122 ||  || — || March 18, 2001 || Socorro || LINEAR || RAF || align=right | 2.3 km || 
|-id=123 bgcolor=#E9E9E9
| 46123 ||  || — || March 18, 2001 || Socorro || LINEAR || — || align=right | 3.4 km || 
|-id=124 bgcolor=#fefefe
| 46124 ||  || — || March 18, 2001 || Socorro || LINEAR || — || align=right | 3.0 km || 
|-id=125 bgcolor=#fefefe
| 46125 ||  || — || March 18, 2001 || Socorro || LINEAR || — || align=right | 6.3 km || 
|-id=126 bgcolor=#E9E9E9
| 46126 ||  || — || March 18, 2001 || Socorro || LINEAR || — || align=right | 3.8 km || 
|-id=127 bgcolor=#E9E9E9
| 46127 ||  || — || March 18, 2001 || Socorro || LINEAR || — || align=right | 3.7 km || 
|-id=128 bgcolor=#fefefe
| 46128 ||  || — || March 18, 2001 || Socorro || LINEAR || — || align=right | 3.1 km || 
|-id=129 bgcolor=#fefefe
| 46129 ||  || — || March 18, 2001 || Socorro || LINEAR || — || align=right | 2.6 km || 
|-id=130 bgcolor=#E9E9E9
| 46130 ||  || — || March 18, 2001 || Socorro || LINEAR || WIT || align=right | 3.2 km || 
|-id=131 bgcolor=#E9E9E9
| 46131 ||  || — || March 18, 2001 || Socorro || LINEAR || — || align=right | 3.1 km || 
|-id=132 bgcolor=#E9E9E9
| 46132 ||  || — || March 18, 2001 || Socorro || LINEAR || — || align=right | 2.5 km || 
|-id=133 bgcolor=#fefefe
| 46133 ||  || — || March 18, 2001 || Socorro || LINEAR || — || align=right | 2.2 km || 
|-id=134 bgcolor=#d6d6d6
| 46134 ||  || — || March 18, 2001 || Socorro || LINEAR || KOR || align=right | 4.0 km || 
|-id=135 bgcolor=#E9E9E9
| 46135 ||  || — || March 23, 2001 || Socorro || LINEAR || GEF || align=right | 4.4 km || 
|-id=136 bgcolor=#d6d6d6
| 46136 ||  || — || March 23, 2001 || Socorro || LINEAR || HYG || align=right | 7.7 km || 
|-id=137 bgcolor=#d6d6d6
| 46137 ||  || — || March 23, 2001 || Socorro || LINEAR || ALA || align=right | 12 km || 
|-id=138 bgcolor=#E9E9E9
| 46138 ||  || — || March 21, 2001 || Anderson Mesa || LONEOS || — || align=right | 7.5 km || 
|-id=139 bgcolor=#d6d6d6
| 46139 ||  || — || March 21, 2001 || Anderson Mesa || LONEOS || — || align=right | 5.3 km || 
|-id=140 bgcolor=#E9E9E9
| 46140 ||  || — || March 21, 2001 || Socorro || LINEAR || GEF || align=right | 4.4 km || 
|-id=141 bgcolor=#d6d6d6
| 46141 ||  || — || March 21, 2001 || Anderson Mesa || LONEOS || — || align=right | 7.8 km || 
|-id=142 bgcolor=#d6d6d6
| 46142 ||  || — || March 24, 2001 || Haleakala || NEAT || — || align=right | 8.5 km || 
|-id=143 bgcolor=#d6d6d6
| 46143 ||  || — || March 19, 2001 || Socorro || LINEAR || — || align=right | 8.2 km || 
|-id=144 bgcolor=#E9E9E9
| 46144 ||  || — || March 19, 2001 || Socorro || LINEAR || — || align=right | 2.0 km || 
|-id=145 bgcolor=#d6d6d6
| 46145 ||  || — || March 19, 2001 || Socorro || LINEAR || — || align=right | 3.5 km || 
|-id=146 bgcolor=#E9E9E9
| 46146 ||  || — || March 19, 2001 || Socorro || LINEAR || — || align=right | 4.7 km || 
|-id=147 bgcolor=#E9E9E9
| 46147 ||  || — || March 19, 2001 || Socorro || LINEAR || — || align=right | 4.7 km || 
|-id=148 bgcolor=#fefefe
| 46148 ||  || — || March 19, 2001 || Socorro || LINEAR || V || align=right | 2.0 km || 
|-id=149 bgcolor=#d6d6d6
| 46149 ||  || — || March 19, 2001 || Socorro || LINEAR || MEL || align=right | 10 km || 
|-id=150 bgcolor=#E9E9E9
| 46150 ||  || — || March 19, 2001 || Socorro || LINEAR || — || align=right | 4.1 km || 
|-id=151 bgcolor=#d6d6d6
| 46151 ||  || — || March 19, 2001 || Socorro || LINEAR || EOS || align=right | 6.9 km || 
|-id=152 bgcolor=#E9E9E9
| 46152 ||  || — || March 19, 2001 || Socorro || LINEAR || — || align=right | 2.5 km || 
|-id=153 bgcolor=#E9E9E9
| 46153 ||  || — || March 19, 2001 || Socorro || LINEAR || — || align=right | 2.3 km || 
|-id=154 bgcolor=#d6d6d6
| 46154 ||  || — || March 19, 2001 || Socorro || LINEAR || — || align=right | 11 km || 
|-id=155 bgcolor=#E9E9E9
| 46155 ||  || — || March 19, 2001 || Socorro || LINEAR || — || align=right | 2.7 km || 
|-id=156 bgcolor=#E9E9E9
| 46156 ||  || — || March 19, 2001 || Socorro || LINEAR || MRX || align=right | 3.1 km || 
|-id=157 bgcolor=#E9E9E9
| 46157 ||  || — || March 19, 2001 || Socorro || LINEAR || — || align=right | 4.3 km || 
|-id=158 bgcolor=#E9E9E9
| 46158 ||  || — || March 19, 2001 || Socorro || LINEAR || EUN || align=right | 3.7 km || 
|-id=159 bgcolor=#d6d6d6
| 46159 ||  || — || March 19, 2001 || Socorro || LINEAR || HYG || align=right | 7.4 km || 
|-id=160 bgcolor=#d6d6d6
| 46160 ||  || — || March 19, 2001 || Socorro || LINEAR || ALA || align=right | 11 km || 
|-id=161 bgcolor=#E9E9E9
| 46161 ||  || — || March 19, 2001 || Socorro || LINEAR || — || align=right | 3.9 km || 
|-id=162 bgcolor=#E9E9E9
| 46162 ||  || — || March 19, 2001 || Socorro || LINEAR || MAR || align=right | 2.9 km || 
|-id=163 bgcolor=#fefefe
| 46163 ||  || — || March 21, 2001 || Socorro || LINEAR || — || align=right | 3.0 km || 
|-id=164 bgcolor=#E9E9E9
| 46164 ||  || — || March 21, 2001 || Socorro || LINEAR || — || align=right | 3.8 km || 
|-id=165 bgcolor=#E9E9E9
| 46165 ||  || — || March 21, 2001 || Socorro || LINEAR || CLO || align=right | 5.8 km || 
|-id=166 bgcolor=#E9E9E9
| 46166 ||  || — || March 23, 2001 || Socorro || LINEAR || GEF || align=right | 3.2 km || 
|-id=167 bgcolor=#fefefe
| 46167 ||  || — || March 26, 2001 || Kitt Peak || Spacewatch || — || align=right | 1.6 km || 
|-id=168 bgcolor=#d6d6d6
| 46168 ||  || — || March 27, 2001 || Desert Beaver || W. K. Y. Yeung || — || align=right | 6.5 km || 
|-id=169 bgcolor=#E9E9E9
| 46169 ||  || — || March 21, 2001 || Anderson Mesa || LONEOS || — || align=right | 6.0 km || 
|-id=170 bgcolor=#E9E9E9
| 46170 ||  || — || March 23, 2001 || Socorro || LINEAR || — || align=right | 4.7 km || 
|-id=171 bgcolor=#E9E9E9
| 46171 ||  || — || March 26, 2001 || Socorro || LINEAR || — || align=right | 4.6 km || 
|-id=172 bgcolor=#fefefe
| 46172 ||  || — || March 16, 2001 || Socorro || LINEAR || — || align=right | 2.8 km || 
|-id=173 bgcolor=#E9E9E9
| 46173 ||  || — || March 16, 2001 || Socorro || LINEAR || — || align=right | 3.6 km || 
|-id=174 bgcolor=#E9E9E9
| 46174 ||  || — || March 16, 2001 || Socorro || LINEAR || — || align=right | 4.3 km || 
|-id=175 bgcolor=#fefefe
| 46175 ||  || — || March 16, 2001 || Socorro || LINEAR || V || align=right | 1.5 km || 
|-id=176 bgcolor=#E9E9E9
| 46176 ||  || — || March 16, 2001 || Socorro || LINEAR || — || align=right | 2.8 km || 
|-id=177 bgcolor=#d6d6d6
| 46177 ||  || — || March 16, 2001 || Socorro || LINEAR || — || align=right | 11 km || 
|-id=178 bgcolor=#d6d6d6
| 46178 ||  || — || March 16, 2001 || Socorro || LINEAR || — || align=right | 8.5 km || 
|-id=179 bgcolor=#E9E9E9
| 46179 ||  || — || March 16, 2001 || Socorro || LINEAR || GEF || align=right | 3.5 km || 
|-id=180 bgcolor=#fefefe
| 46180 ||  || — || March 17, 2001 || Socorro || LINEAR || FLO || align=right | 1.8 km || 
|-id=181 bgcolor=#E9E9E9
| 46181 ||  || — || March 18, 2001 || Haleakala || NEAT || — || align=right | 3.7 km || 
|-id=182 bgcolor=#fefefe
| 46182 ||  || — || March 20, 2001 || Haleakala || NEAT || FLO || align=right | 1.6 km || 
|-id=183 bgcolor=#E9E9E9
| 46183 ||  || — || March 20, 2001 || Haleakala || NEAT || — || align=right | 3.8 km || 
|-id=184 bgcolor=#E9E9E9
| 46184 ||  || — || March 26, 2001 || Socorro || LINEAR || — || align=right | 3.9 km || 
|-id=185 bgcolor=#E9E9E9
| 46185 ||  || — || March 23, 2001 || Anderson Mesa || LONEOS || — || align=right | 4.1 km || 
|-id=186 bgcolor=#fefefe
| 46186 ||  || — || March 29, 2001 || Anderson Mesa || LONEOS || NYS || align=right | 2.2 km || 
|-id=187 bgcolor=#E9E9E9
| 46187 ||  || — || March 26, 2001 || Socorro || LINEAR || — || align=right | 4.1 km || 
|-id=188 bgcolor=#E9E9E9
| 46188 ||  || — || March 21, 2001 || Anderson Mesa || LONEOS || — || align=right | 3.1 km || 
|-id=189 bgcolor=#E9E9E9
| 46189 ||  || — || March 21, 2001 || Socorro || LINEAR || — || align=right | 7.1 km || 
|-id=190 bgcolor=#E9E9E9
| 46190 ||  || — || March 21, 2001 || Socorro || LINEAR || — || align=right | 5.8 km || 
|-id=191 bgcolor=#d6d6d6
| 46191 ||  || — || March 22, 2001 || Kitt Peak || Spacewatch || — || align=right | 6.7 km || 
|-id=192 bgcolor=#E9E9E9
| 46192 ||  || — || March 23, 2001 || Anderson Mesa || LONEOS || — || align=right | 2.7 km || 
|-id=193 bgcolor=#d6d6d6
| 46193 ||  || — || March 23, 2001 || Anderson Mesa || LONEOS || KOR || align=right | 3.5 km || 
|-id=194 bgcolor=#fefefe
| 46194 ||  || — || March 23, 2001 || Anderson Mesa || LONEOS || V || align=right | 1.9 km || 
|-id=195 bgcolor=#E9E9E9
| 46195 ||  || — || March 23, 2001 || Anderson Mesa || LONEOS || HOF || align=right | 6.5 km || 
|-id=196 bgcolor=#E9E9E9
| 46196 ||  || — || March 23, 2001 || Haleakala || NEAT || — || align=right | 7.7 km || 
|-id=197 bgcolor=#fefefe
| 46197 ||  || — || March 24, 2001 || Anderson Mesa || LONEOS || — || align=right | 3.9 km || 
|-id=198 bgcolor=#E9E9E9
| 46198 ||  || — || March 24, 2001 || Anderson Mesa || LONEOS || MAR || align=right | 3.2 km || 
|-id=199 bgcolor=#E9E9E9
| 46199 ||  || — || March 24, 2001 || Anderson Mesa || LONEOS || — || align=right | 2.9 km || 
|-id=200 bgcolor=#E9E9E9
| 46200 ||  || — || March 24, 2001 || Anderson Mesa || LONEOS || — || align=right | 3.0 km || 
|}

46201–46300 

|-bgcolor=#E9E9E9
| 46201 ||  || — || March 24, 2001 || Anderson Mesa || LONEOS || — || align=right | 3.9 km || 
|-id=202 bgcolor=#E9E9E9
| 46202 ||  || — || March 24, 2001 || Haleakala || NEAT || — || align=right | 3.5 km || 
|-id=203 bgcolor=#E9E9E9
| 46203 ||  || — || March 26, 2001 || Socorro || LINEAR || GEF || align=right | 2.8 km || 
|-id=204 bgcolor=#d6d6d6
| 46204 ||  || — || March 26, 2001 || Socorro || LINEAR || — || align=right | 8.4 km || 
|-id=205 bgcolor=#E9E9E9
| 46205 ||  || — || March 26, 2001 || Socorro || LINEAR || MAR || align=right | 3.4 km || 
|-id=206 bgcolor=#E9E9E9
| 46206 ||  || — || March 26, 2001 || Haleakala || NEAT || AER || align=right | 3.3 km || 
|-id=207 bgcolor=#fefefe
| 46207 ||  || — || March 27, 2001 || Anderson Mesa || LONEOS || — || align=right | 2.2 km || 
|-id=208 bgcolor=#d6d6d6
| 46208 Gicquel ||  ||  || March 29, 2001 || Anderson Mesa || LONEOS || THM || align=right | 6.5 km || 
|-id=209 bgcolor=#d6d6d6
| 46209 ||  || — || March 29, 2001 || Haleakala || NEAT || FIR || align=right | 9.9 km || 
|-id=210 bgcolor=#fefefe
| 46210 ||  || — || March 29, 2001 || Haleakala || NEAT || — || align=right | 2.6 km || 
|-id=211 bgcolor=#d6d6d6
| 46211 ||  || — || March 29, 2001 || Haleakala || NEAT || EOS || align=right | 5.9 km || 
|-id=212 bgcolor=#d6d6d6
| 46212 ||  || — || March 30, 2001 || Haleakala || NEAT || SAN || align=right | 4.4 km || 
|-id=213 bgcolor=#fefefe
| 46213 ||  || — || March 31, 2001 || Socorro || LINEAR || — || align=right | 3.3 km || 
|-id=214 bgcolor=#E9E9E9
| 46214 ||  || — || March 19, 2001 || Haleakala || NEAT || — || align=right | 3.4 km || 
|-id=215 bgcolor=#E9E9E9
| 46215 ||  || — || March 24, 2001 || Anderson Mesa || LONEOS || — || align=right | 5.5 km || 
|-id=216 bgcolor=#E9E9E9
| 46216 ||  || — || March 24, 2001 || Haleakala || NEAT || MAR || align=right | 3.4 km || 
|-id=217 bgcolor=#E9E9E9
| 46217 ||  || — || March 16, 2001 || Socorro || LINEAR || — || align=right | 2.4 km || 
|-id=218 bgcolor=#d6d6d6
| 46218 ||  || — || March 18, 2001 || Haleakala || NEAT || — || align=right | 4.9 km || 
|-id=219 bgcolor=#E9E9E9
| 46219 ||  || — || March 19, 2001 || Anderson Mesa || LONEOS || — || align=right | 3.2 km || 
|-id=220 bgcolor=#d6d6d6
| 46220 ||  || — || March 18, 2001 || Socorro || LINEAR || THM || align=right | 7.8 km || 
|-id=221 bgcolor=#d6d6d6
| 46221 || 2001 GP || — || April 1, 2001 || Socorro || LINEAR || — || align=right | 5.3 km || 
|-id=222 bgcolor=#d6d6d6
| 46222 ||  || — || April 15, 2001 || Socorro || LINEAR || THB || align=right | 11 km || 
|-id=223 bgcolor=#E9E9E9
| 46223 ||  || — || April 15, 2001 || Socorro || LINEAR || RAF || align=right | 2.5 km || 
|-id=224 bgcolor=#d6d6d6
| 46224 ||  || — || April 15, 2001 || Haleakala || NEAT || — || align=right | 6.2 km || 
|-id=225 bgcolor=#d6d6d6
| 46225 ||  || — || April 15, 2001 || Haleakala || NEAT || HYG || align=right | 6.6 km || 
|-id=226 bgcolor=#d6d6d6
| 46226 ||  || — || April 17, 2001 || Socorro || LINEAR || — || align=right | 7.0 km || 
|-id=227 bgcolor=#d6d6d6
| 46227 ||  || — || April 17, 2001 || Socorro || LINEAR || ALA || align=right | 11 km || 
|-id=228 bgcolor=#d6d6d6
| 46228 ||  || — || April 17, 2001 || Socorro || LINEAR || THM || align=right | 5.8 km || 
|-id=229 bgcolor=#E9E9E9
| 46229 ||  || — || April 17, 2001 || Socorro || LINEAR || — || align=right | 2.7 km || 
|-id=230 bgcolor=#E9E9E9
| 46230 ||  || — || April 16, 2001 || Socorro || LINEAR || EUN || align=right | 3.3 km || 
|-id=231 bgcolor=#d6d6d6
| 46231 ||  || — || April 18, 2001 || Socorro || LINEAR || — || align=right | 16 km || 
|-id=232 bgcolor=#d6d6d6
| 46232 ||  || — || April 17, 2001 || Desert Beaver || W. K. Y. Yeung || — || align=right | 4.6 km || 
|-id=233 bgcolor=#E9E9E9
| 46233 ||  || — || April 16, 2001 || Socorro || LINEAR || EUN || align=right | 2.4 km || 
|-id=234 bgcolor=#d6d6d6
| 46234 ||  || — || April 16, 2001 || Socorro || LINEAR || — || align=right | 6.2 km || 
|-id=235 bgcolor=#E9E9E9
| 46235 ||  || — || April 16, 2001 || Socorro || LINEAR || — || align=right | 9.2 km || 
|-id=236 bgcolor=#E9E9E9
| 46236 ||  || — || April 16, 2001 || Socorro || LINEAR || — || align=right | 5.1 km || 
|-id=237 bgcolor=#E9E9E9
| 46237 ||  || — || April 16, 2001 || Socorro || LINEAR || JUN || align=right | 4.2 km || 
|-id=238 bgcolor=#fefefe
| 46238 ||  || — || April 16, 2001 || Socorro || LINEAR || V || align=right | 2.1 km || 
|-id=239 bgcolor=#E9E9E9
| 46239 ||  || — || April 17, 2001 || Socorro || LINEAR || EUN || align=right | 3.7 km || 
|-id=240 bgcolor=#E9E9E9
| 46240 ||  || — || April 18, 2001 || Socorro || LINEAR || — || align=right | 3.3 km || 
|-id=241 bgcolor=#d6d6d6
| 46241 ||  || — || April 18, 2001 || Socorro || LINEAR || EOS || align=right | 4.5 km || 
|-id=242 bgcolor=#d6d6d6
| 46242 ||  || — || April 18, 2001 || Socorro || LINEAR || EOS || align=right | 4.9 km || 
|-id=243 bgcolor=#E9E9E9
| 46243 ||  || — || April 18, 2001 || Socorro || LINEAR || — || align=right | 4.6 km || 
|-id=244 bgcolor=#d6d6d6
| 46244 ||  || — || April 24, 2001 || Desert Beaver || W. K. Y. Yeung || ALA || align=right | 13 km || 
|-id=245 bgcolor=#d6d6d6
| 46245 ||  || — || April 21, 2001 || Socorro || LINEAR || EOS || align=right | 5.9 km || 
|-id=246 bgcolor=#d6d6d6
| 46246 ||  || — || April 23, 2001 || Socorro || LINEAR || — || align=right | 9.3 km || 
|-id=247 bgcolor=#d6d6d6
| 46247 ||  || — || April 23, 2001 || Socorro || LINEAR || — || align=right | 4.3 km || 
|-id=248 bgcolor=#d6d6d6
| 46248 ||  || — || April 25, 2001 || Ametlla de Mar || Ametlla de Mar Obs. || URS || align=right | 13 km || 
|-id=249 bgcolor=#d6d6d6
| 46249 ||  || — || April 25, 2001 || Desert Beaver || W. K. Y. Yeung || THM || align=right | 6.1 km || 
|-id=250 bgcolor=#d6d6d6
| 46250 ||  || — || April 27, 2001 || Socorro || LINEAR || HYG || align=right | 9.8 km || 
|-id=251 bgcolor=#d6d6d6
| 46251 ||  || — || April 26, 2001 || Desert Beaver || W. K. Y. Yeung || — || align=right | 6.9 km || 
|-id=252 bgcolor=#d6d6d6
| 46252 ||  || — || April 30, 2001 || Kleť || Kleť Obs. || — || align=right | 12 km || 
|-id=253 bgcolor=#d6d6d6
| 46253 ||  || — || April 27, 2001 || Socorro || LINEAR || EOS || align=right | 6.9 km || 
|-id=254 bgcolor=#d6d6d6
| 46254 ||  || — || April 29, 2001 || Socorro || LINEAR || TIR || align=right | 5.2 km || 
|-id=255 bgcolor=#d6d6d6
| 46255 ||  || — || April 29, 2001 || Socorro || LINEAR || — || align=right | 13 km || 
|-id=256 bgcolor=#E9E9E9
| 46256 ||  || — || April 27, 2001 || Socorro || LINEAR || — || align=right | 3.1 km || 
|-id=257 bgcolor=#d6d6d6
| 46257 ||  || — || April 16, 2001 || Anderson Mesa || LONEOS || — || align=right | 11 km || 
|-id=258 bgcolor=#fefefe
| 46258 ||  || — || April 16, 2001 || Anderson Mesa || LONEOS || FLO || align=right | 2.5 km || 
|-id=259 bgcolor=#E9E9E9
| 46259 ||  || — || April 17, 2001 || Anderson Mesa || LONEOS || GEF || align=right | 3.4 km || 
|-id=260 bgcolor=#d6d6d6
| 46260 ||  || — || April 17, 2001 || Anderson Mesa || LONEOS || — || align=right | 8.1 km || 
|-id=261 bgcolor=#E9E9E9
| 46261 ||  || — || April 18, 2001 || Haleakala || NEAT || — || align=right | 4.0 km || 
|-id=262 bgcolor=#E9E9E9
| 46262 ||  || — || April 19, 2001 || Haleakala || NEAT || EUN || align=right | 4.2 km || 
|-id=263 bgcolor=#d6d6d6
| 46263 ||  || — || April 21, 2001 || Socorro || LINEAR || URS || align=right | 16 km || 
|-id=264 bgcolor=#d6d6d6
| 46264 ||  || — || April 21, 2001 || Socorro || LINEAR || — || align=right | 3.8 km || 
|-id=265 bgcolor=#d6d6d6
| 46265 ||  || — || April 23, 2001 || Socorro || LINEAR || — || align=right | 6.9 km || 
|-id=266 bgcolor=#d6d6d6
| 46266 ||  || — || April 23, 2001 || Socorro || LINEAR || EOS || align=right | 4.7 km || 
|-id=267 bgcolor=#E9E9E9
| 46267 ||  || — || April 24, 2001 || Socorro || LINEAR || — || align=right | 3.1 km || 
|-id=268 bgcolor=#E9E9E9
| 46268 ||  || — || April 24, 2001 || Haleakala || NEAT || — || align=right | 4.6 km || 
|-id=269 bgcolor=#d6d6d6
| 46269 ||  || — || April 25, 2001 || Anderson Mesa || LONEOS || EOS || align=right | 4.9 km || 
|-id=270 bgcolor=#d6d6d6
| 46270 ||  || — || April 26, 2001 || Anderson Mesa || LONEOS || THM || align=right | 7.3 km || 
|-id=271 bgcolor=#d6d6d6
| 46271 ||  || — || April 26, 2001 || Anderson Mesa || LONEOS || EOS || align=right | 5.0 km || 
|-id=272 bgcolor=#d6d6d6
| 46272 ||  || — || April 27, 2001 || Haleakala || NEAT || SAN || align=right | 3.9 km || 
|-id=273 bgcolor=#E9E9E9
| 46273 ||  || — || April 27, 2001 || Haleakala || NEAT || HEN || align=right | 3.0 km || 
|-id=274 bgcolor=#E9E9E9
| 46274 ||  || — || May 15, 2001 || Haleakala || NEAT || — || align=right | 6.8 km || 
|-id=275 bgcolor=#d6d6d6
| 46275 ||  || — || May 15, 2001 || Haleakala || NEAT || — || align=right | 9.1 km || 
|-id=276 bgcolor=#E9E9E9
| 46276 ||  || — || May 15, 2001 || Palomar || NEAT || — || align=right | 5.8 km || 
|-id=277 bgcolor=#d6d6d6
| 46277 Jeffhall ||  ||  || May 15, 2001 || Anderson Mesa || LONEOS || — || align=right | 8.4 km || 
|-id=278 bgcolor=#d6d6d6
| 46278 || 2001 KM || — || May 17, 2001 || Socorro || LINEAR || — || align=right | 9.3 km || 
|-id=279 bgcolor=#E9E9E9
| 46279 ||  || — || May 18, 2001 || Socorro || LINEAR || — || align=right | 9.9 km || 
|-id=280 bgcolor=#E9E9E9
| 46280 Hollar ||  ||  || May 21, 2001 || Ondřejov || P. Pravec, P. Kušnirák || EUN || align=right | 4.3 km || 
|-id=281 bgcolor=#fefefe
| 46281 ||  || — || May 22, 2001 || Socorro || LINEAR || V || align=right | 2.2 km || 
|-id=282 bgcolor=#d6d6d6
| 46282 ||  || — || May 17, 2001 || Socorro || LINEAR || — || align=right | 4.1 km || 
|-id=283 bgcolor=#d6d6d6
| 46283 ||  || — || May 21, 2001 || Socorro || LINEAR || — || align=right | 5.2 km || 
|-id=284 bgcolor=#fefefe
| 46284 ||  || — || May 18, 2001 || Socorro || LINEAR || — || align=right | 4.6 km || 
|-id=285 bgcolor=#d6d6d6
| 46285 ||  || — || May 18, 2001 || Socorro || LINEAR || — || align=right | 7.2 km || 
|-id=286 bgcolor=#d6d6d6
| 46286 ||  || — || May 22, 2001 || Socorro || LINEAR || EOS || align=right | 6.0 km || 
|-id=287 bgcolor=#d6d6d6
| 46287 ||  || — || May 23, 2001 || Socorro || LINEAR || — || align=right | 9.5 km || 
|-id=288 bgcolor=#d6d6d6
| 46288 ||  || — || May 22, 2001 || Socorro || LINEAR || EOS || align=right | 7.0 km || 
|-id=289 bgcolor=#E9E9E9
| 46289 ||  || — || May 24, 2001 || Socorro || LINEAR || — || align=right | 5.0 km || 
|-id=290 bgcolor=#E9E9E9
| 46290 ||  || — || May 16, 2001 || Haleakala || NEAT || — || align=right | 2.8 km || 
|-id=291 bgcolor=#d6d6d6
| 46291 ||  || — || May 17, 2001 || Haleakala || NEAT || EOS || align=right | 4.1 km || 
|-id=292 bgcolor=#d6d6d6
| 46292 ||  || — || May 23, 2001 || Socorro || LINEAR || — || align=right | 6.5 km || 
|-id=293 bgcolor=#d6d6d6
| 46293 ||  || — || May 26, 2001 || Socorro || LINEAR || EOS || align=right | 5.7 km || 
|-id=294 bgcolor=#E9E9E9
| 46294 ||  || — || May 22, 2001 || Anderson Mesa || LONEOS || — || align=right | 4.0 km || 
|-id=295 bgcolor=#d6d6d6
| 46295 ||  || — || May 23, 2001 || Haleakala || NEAT || — || align=right | 7.6 km || 
|-id=296 bgcolor=#d6d6d6
| 46296 ||  || — || May 24, 2001 || Anderson Mesa || LONEOS || — || align=right | 8.1 km || 
|-id=297 bgcolor=#E9E9E9
| 46297 ||  || — || June 24, 2001 || Palomar || NEAT || EUN || align=right | 4.4 km || 
|-id=298 bgcolor=#d6d6d6
| 46298 ||  || — || June 29, 2001 || Anderson Mesa || LONEOS || — || align=right | 5.0 km || 
|-id=299 bgcolor=#d6d6d6
| 46299 ||  || — || June 16, 2001 || Anderson Mesa || LONEOS || — || align=right | 15 km || 
|-id=300 bgcolor=#d6d6d6
| 46300 ||  || — || June 22, 2001 || Palomar || NEAT || THM || align=right | 7.2 km || 
|}

46301–46400 

|-bgcolor=#E9E9E9
| 46301 ||  || — || July 17, 2001 || Anderson Mesa || LONEOS || ADE || align=right | 9.6 km || 
|-id=302 bgcolor=#d6d6d6
| 46302 ||  || — || July 20, 2001 || Socorro || LINEAR || 3:2 || align=right | 17 km || 
|-id=303 bgcolor=#E9E9E9
| 46303 ||  || — || July 16, 2001 || Anderson Mesa || LONEOS || — || align=right | 11 km || 
|-id=304 bgcolor=#E9E9E9
| 46304 ||  || — || July 20, 2001 || Anderson Mesa || LONEOS || — || align=right | 4.3 km || 
|-id=305 bgcolor=#d6d6d6
| 46305 ||  || — || July 21, 2001 || Haleakala || NEAT || 7:4 || align=right | 7.8 km || 
|-id=306 bgcolor=#E9E9E9
| 46306 ||  || — || July 29, 2001 || Anderson Mesa || LONEOS || — || align=right | 5.5 km || 
|-id=307 bgcolor=#d6d6d6
| 46307 ||  || — || July 28, 2001 || Anderson Mesa || LONEOS || — || align=right | 4.7 km || 
|-id=308 bgcolor=#d6d6d6
| 46308 Joelsercel ||  ||  || July 28, 2001 || Anderson Mesa || LONEOS || KOR || align=right | 5.4 km || 
|-id=309 bgcolor=#d6d6d6
| 46309 ||  || — || August 16, 2001 || Socorro || LINEAR || — || align=right | 9.0 km || 
|-id=310 bgcolor=#E9E9E9
| 46310 ||  || — || August 16, 2001 || Socorro || LINEAR || — || align=right | 5.4 km || 
|-id=311 bgcolor=#d6d6d6
| 46311 ||  || — || August 16, 2001 || Socorro || LINEAR || — || align=right | 4.0 km || 
|-id=312 bgcolor=#E9E9E9
| 46312 ||  || — || August 16, 2001 || Socorro || LINEAR || — || align=right | 2.8 km || 
|-id=313 bgcolor=#d6d6d6
| 46313 ||  || — || August 16, 2001 || Socorro || LINEAR || EOS || align=right | 6.7 km || 
|-id=314 bgcolor=#fefefe
| 46314 ||  || — || August 16, 2001 || Socorro || LINEAR || — || align=right | 2.7 km || 
|-id=315 bgcolor=#E9E9E9
| 46315 ||  || — || August 16, 2001 || Socorro || LINEAR || — || align=right | 3.8 km || 
|-id=316 bgcolor=#fefefe
| 46316 ||  || — || August 16, 2001 || Socorro || LINEAR || — || align=right | 2.3 km || 
|-id=317 bgcolor=#E9E9E9
| 46317 ||  || — || August 16, 2001 || Socorro || LINEAR || MIT || align=right | 5.5 km || 
|-id=318 bgcolor=#E9E9E9
| 46318 ||  || — || August 16, 2001 || Socorro || LINEAR || — || align=right | 4.6 km || 
|-id=319 bgcolor=#E9E9E9
| 46319 ||  || — || August 16, 2001 || Socorro || LINEAR || — || align=right | 5.2 km || 
|-id=320 bgcolor=#fefefe
| 46320 ||  || — || August 16, 2001 || Socorro || LINEAR || V || align=right | 2.3 km || 
|-id=321 bgcolor=#d6d6d6
| 46321 ||  || — || August 18, 2001 || Socorro || LINEAR || KOR || align=right | 4.4 km || 
|-id=322 bgcolor=#E9E9E9
| 46322 ||  || — || August 22, 2001 || Socorro || LINEAR || — || align=right | 6.2 km || 
|-id=323 bgcolor=#d6d6d6
| 46323 ||  || — || August 17, 2001 || Socorro || LINEAR || EOS || align=right | 7.5 km || 
|-id=324 bgcolor=#E9E9E9
| 46324 ||  || — || August 18, 2001 || Socorro || LINEAR || — || align=right | 4.5 km || 
|-id=325 bgcolor=#d6d6d6
| 46325 ||  || — || August 20, 2001 || Socorro || LINEAR || EOS || align=right | 13 km || 
|-id=326 bgcolor=#fefefe
| 46326 ||  || — || August 20, 2001 || Haleakala || NEAT || FLO || align=right | 3.0 km || 
|-id=327 bgcolor=#d6d6d6
| 46327 ||  || — || August 23, 2001 || Anderson Mesa || LONEOS || — || align=right | 3.8 km || 
|-id=328 bgcolor=#E9E9E9
| 46328 ||  || — || August 23, 2001 || Anderson Mesa || LONEOS || HEN || align=right | 2.4 km || 
|-id=329 bgcolor=#d6d6d6
| 46329 ||  || — || August 24, 2001 || Socorro || LINEAR || — || align=right | 5.6 km || 
|-id=330 bgcolor=#d6d6d6
| 46330 ||  || — || August 24, 2001 || Socorro || LINEAR || — || align=right | 5.6 km || 
|-id=331 bgcolor=#E9E9E9
| 46331 ||  || — || August 25, 2001 || Anderson Mesa || LONEOS || — || align=right | 3.2 km || 
|-id=332 bgcolor=#d6d6d6
| 46332 ||  || — || August 19, 2001 || Socorro || LINEAR || EOS || align=right | 8.5 km || 
|-id=333 bgcolor=#d6d6d6
| 46333 ||  || — || August 19, 2001 || Socorro || LINEAR || EOS || align=right | 7.1 km || 
|-id=334 bgcolor=#E9E9E9
| 46334 ||  || — || August 24, 2001 || Anderson Mesa || LONEOS || EUN || align=right | 3.7 km || 
|-id=335 bgcolor=#E9E9E9
| 46335 ||  || — || September 12, 2001 || Socorro || LINEAR || — || align=right | 2.6 km || 
|-id=336 bgcolor=#E9E9E9
| 46336 ||  || — || September 10, 2001 || Socorro || LINEAR || PAD || align=right | 7.1 km || 
|-id=337 bgcolor=#E9E9E9
| 46337 ||  || — || September 10, 2001 || Socorro || LINEAR || — || align=right | 3.2 km || 
|-id=338 bgcolor=#d6d6d6
| 46338 ||  || — || September 12, 2001 || Palomar || NEAT || — || align=right | 7.4 km || 
|-id=339 bgcolor=#E9E9E9
| 46339 ||  || — || September 14, 2001 || Palomar || NEAT || — || align=right | 4.0 km || 
|-id=340 bgcolor=#E9E9E9
| 46340 ||  || — || September 11, 2001 || Anderson Mesa || LONEOS || — || align=right | 2.6 km || 
|-id=341 bgcolor=#E9E9E9
| 46341 ||  || — || September 11, 2001 || Anderson Mesa || LONEOS || — || align=right | 5.7 km || 
|-id=342 bgcolor=#d6d6d6
| 46342 ||  || — || September 16, 2001 || Socorro || LINEAR || THM || align=right | 9.6 km || 
|-id=343 bgcolor=#E9E9E9
| 46343 ||  || — || September 16, 2001 || Socorro || LINEAR || — || align=right | 4.4 km || 
|-id=344 bgcolor=#E9E9E9
| 46344 ||  || — || September 17, 2001 || Socorro || LINEAR || — || align=right | 2.5 km || 
|-id=345 bgcolor=#fefefe
| 46345 ||  || — || September 20, 2001 || Socorro || LINEAR || — || align=right | 4.1 km || 
|-id=346 bgcolor=#E9E9E9
| 46346 ||  || — || September 18, 2001 || Desert Eagle || W. K. Y. Yeung || ADE || align=right | 6.7 km || 
|-id=347 bgcolor=#d6d6d6
| 46347 ||  || — || September 16, 2001 || Socorro || LINEAR || EOS || align=right | 5.9 km || 
|-id=348 bgcolor=#d6d6d6
| 46348 ||  || — || September 16, 2001 || Socorro || LINEAR || — || align=right | 5.2 km || 
|-id=349 bgcolor=#E9E9E9
| 46349 ||  || — || September 16, 2001 || Socorro || LINEAR || — || align=right | 3.6 km || 
|-id=350 bgcolor=#d6d6d6
| 46350 ||  || — || September 19, 2001 || Socorro || LINEAR || VER || align=right | 8.7 km || 
|-id=351 bgcolor=#d6d6d6
| 46351 ||  || — || September 19, 2001 || Socorro || LINEAR || THM || align=right | 6.6 km || 
|-id=352 bgcolor=#fefefe
| 46352 ||  || — || September 25, 2001 || Desert Eagle || W. K. Y. Yeung || — || align=right | 3.2 km || 
|-id=353 bgcolor=#E9E9E9
| 46353 ||  || — || October 11, 2001 || Desert Eagle || W. K. Y. Yeung || — || align=right | 5.6 km || 
|-id=354 bgcolor=#E9E9E9
| 46354 ||  || — || October 9, 2001 || Socorro || LINEAR || EUN || align=right | 6.9 km || 
|-id=355 bgcolor=#d6d6d6
| 46355 ||  || — || October 13, 2001 || Socorro || LINEAR || — || align=right | 9.7 km || 
|-id=356 bgcolor=#fefefe
| 46356 ||  || — || October 13, 2001 || Socorro || LINEAR || — || align=right | 2.1 km || 
|-id=357 bgcolor=#E9E9E9
| 46357 ||  || — || October 13, 2001 || Socorro || LINEAR || MAR || align=right | 3.3 km || 
|-id=358 bgcolor=#fefefe
| 46358 ||  || — || October 13, 2001 || Socorro || LINEAR || — || align=right | 1.9 km || 
|-id=359 bgcolor=#E9E9E9
| 46359 ||  || — || October 13, 2001 || Socorro || LINEAR || — || align=right | 7.1 km || 
|-id=360 bgcolor=#fefefe
| 46360 ||  || — || October 13, 2001 || Socorro || LINEAR || NYS || align=right | 2.0 km || 
|-id=361 bgcolor=#E9E9E9
| 46361 ||  || — || October 13, 2001 || Socorro || LINEAR || — || align=right | 9.3 km || 
|-id=362 bgcolor=#d6d6d6
| 46362 ||  || — || October 15, 2001 || Socorro || LINEAR || — || align=right | 10 km || 
|-id=363 bgcolor=#E9E9E9
| 46363 ||  || — || October 16, 2001 || Socorro || LINEAR || — || align=right | 6.4 km || 
|-id=364 bgcolor=#d6d6d6
| 46364 ||  || — || October 16, 2001 || Socorro || LINEAR || — || align=right | 8.6 km || 
|-id=365 bgcolor=#E9E9E9
| 46365 ||  || — || October 17, 2001 || Socorro || LINEAR || — || align=right | 2.5 km || 
|-id=366 bgcolor=#E9E9E9
| 46366 ||  || — || October 18, 2001 || Socorro || LINEAR || KON || align=right | 7.7 km || 
|-id=367 bgcolor=#E9E9E9
| 46367 ||  || — || October 22, 2001 || Palomar || NEAT || EUN || align=right | 4.3 km || 
|-id=368 bgcolor=#fefefe
| 46368 ||  || — || November 9, 2001 || Socorro || LINEAR || — || align=right | 3.0 km || 
|-id=369 bgcolor=#fefefe
| 46369 ||  || — || November 9, 2001 || Socorro || LINEAR || FLO || align=right | 1.6 km || 
|-id=370 bgcolor=#fefefe
| 46370 ||  || — || November 9, 2001 || Socorro || LINEAR || — || align=right | 2.3 km || 
|-id=371 bgcolor=#fefefe
| 46371 ||  || — || November 9, 2001 || Socorro || LINEAR || V || align=right | 2.4 km || 
|-id=372 bgcolor=#E9E9E9
| 46372 ||  || — || November 10, 2001 || Socorro || LINEAR || — || align=right | 3.8 km || 
|-id=373 bgcolor=#E9E9E9
| 46373 ||  || — || November 11, 2001 || Anderson Mesa || LONEOS || — || align=right | 3.0 km || 
|-id=374 bgcolor=#fefefe
| 46374 ||  || — || November 17, 2001 || Socorro || LINEAR || — || align=right | 6.7 km || 
|-id=375 bgcolor=#E9E9E9
| 46375 ||  || — || November 17, 2001 || Socorro || LINEAR || — || align=right | 5.6 km || 
|-id=376 bgcolor=#fefefe
| 46376 ||  || — || December 9, 2001 || Socorro || LINEAR || H || align=right | 1.8 km || 
|-id=377 bgcolor=#d6d6d6
| 46377 ||  || — || December 8, 2001 || Socorro || LINEAR || — || align=right | 9.5 km || 
|-id=378 bgcolor=#fefefe
| 46378 ||  || — || December 9, 2001 || Socorro || LINEAR || FLO || align=right | 3.3 km || 
|-id=379 bgcolor=#fefefe
| 46379 ||  || — || December 9, 2001 || Socorro || LINEAR || V || align=right | 1.5 km || 
|-id=380 bgcolor=#E9E9E9
| 46380 ||  || — || December 10, 2001 || Socorro || LINEAR || — || align=right | 3.3 km || 
|-id=381 bgcolor=#fefefe
| 46381 ||  || — || December 10, 2001 || Socorro || LINEAR || NYS || align=right | 2.1 km || 
|-id=382 bgcolor=#fefefe
| 46382 ||  || — || December 11, 2001 || Socorro || LINEAR || — || align=right | 5.6 km || 
|-id=383 bgcolor=#fefefe
| 46383 ||  || — || December 13, 2001 || Socorro || LINEAR || V || align=right | 2.3 km || 
|-id=384 bgcolor=#fefefe
| 46384 ||  || — || December 13, 2001 || Socorro || LINEAR || V || align=right | 1.5 km || 
|-id=385 bgcolor=#fefefe
| 46385 ||  || — || December 14, 2001 || Socorro || LINEAR || — || align=right | 2.9 km || 
|-id=386 bgcolor=#fefefe
| 46386 ||  || — || December 14, 2001 || Socorro || LINEAR || — || align=right | 2.1 km || 
|-id=387 bgcolor=#E9E9E9
| 46387 ||  || — || December 13, 2001 || Socorro || LINEAR || — || align=right | 3.0 km || 
|-id=388 bgcolor=#fefefe
| 46388 ||  || — || December 15, 2001 || Socorro || LINEAR || — || align=right | 1.8 km || 
|-id=389 bgcolor=#E9E9E9
| 46389 ||  || — || December 18, 2001 || Socorro || LINEAR || — || align=right | 2.9 km || 
|-id=390 bgcolor=#fefefe
| 46390 ||  || — || December 18, 2001 || Palomar || NEAT || — || align=right | 2.3 km || 
|-id=391 bgcolor=#fefefe
| 46391 ||  || — || December 17, 2001 || Socorro || LINEAR || — || align=right | 1.9 km || 
|-id=392 bgcolor=#fefefe
| 46392 Bertola ||  ||  || January 5, 2002 || Asiago || ADAS || — || align=right | 2.7 km || 
|-id=393 bgcolor=#fefefe
| 46393 ||  || — || January 6, 2002 || Haleakala || NEAT || FLO || align=right | 1.8 km || 
|-id=394 bgcolor=#fefefe
| 46394 ||  || — || January 11, 2002 || Oizumi || T. Kobayashi || — || align=right | 2.7 km || 
|-id=395 bgcolor=#fefefe
| 46395 ||  || — || February 4, 2002 || Palomar || NEAT || FLO || align=right | 2.1 km || 
|-id=396 bgcolor=#d6d6d6
| 46396 ||  || — || February 9, 2002 || Desert Eagle || W. K. Y. Yeung || — || align=right | 6.5 km || 
|-id=397 bgcolor=#fefefe
| 46397 ||  || — || February 7, 2002 || Socorro || LINEAR || — || align=right | 1.9 km || 
|-id=398 bgcolor=#fefefe
| 46398 ||  || — || February 9, 2002 || Socorro || LINEAR || — || align=right | 2.6 km || 
|-id=399 bgcolor=#E9E9E9
| 46399 ||  || — || February 8, 2002 || Socorro || LINEAR || — || align=right | 4.8 km || 
|-id=400 bgcolor=#E9E9E9
| 46400 ||  || — || February 10, 2002 || Socorro || LINEAR || — || align=right | 1.9 km || 
|}

46401–46500 

|-bgcolor=#d6d6d6
| 46401 ||  || — || February 11, 2002 || Socorro || LINEAR || KOR || align=right | 3.1 km || 
|-id=402 bgcolor=#fefefe
| 46402 ||  || — || February 16, 2002 || Haleakala || NEAT || — || align=right | 5.0 km || 
|-id=403 bgcolor=#fefefe
| 46403 ||  || — || March 9, 2002 || Socorro || LINEAR || V || align=right | 1.6 km || 
|-id=404 bgcolor=#E9E9E9
| 46404 ||  || — || March 9, 2002 || Socorro || LINEAR || HNS || align=right | 4.2 km || 
|-id=405 bgcolor=#E9E9E9
| 46405 ||  || — || March 9, 2002 || Socorro || LINEAR || HEN || align=right | 2.4 km || 
|-id=406 bgcolor=#E9E9E9
| 46406 ||  || — || March 13, 2002 || Socorro || LINEAR || — || align=right | 2.1 km || 
|-id=407 bgcolor=#E9E9E9
| 46407 ||  || — || March 13, 2002 || Socorro || LINEAR || — || align=right | 4.7 km || 
|-id=408 bgcolor=#E9E9E9
| 46408 ||  || — || March 19, 2002 || Fountain Hills || Fountain Hills Obs. || — || align=right | 4.7 km || 
|-id=409 bgcolor=#d6d6d6
| 46409 ||  || — || March 21, 2002 || Socorro || LINEAR || — || align=right | 9.0 km || 
|-id=410 bgcolor=#fefefe
| 46410 ||  || — || April 2, 2002 || Palomar || NEAT || — || align=right | 2.4 km || 
|-id=411 bgcolor=#E9E9E9
| 46411 ||  || — || April 8, 2002 || Socorro || LINEAR || EUN || align=right | 3.4 km || 
|-id=412 bgcolor=#d6d6d6
| 46412 ||  || — || April 9, 2002 || Socorro || LINEAR || VER || align=right | 6.7 km || 
|-id=413 bgcolor=#fefefe
| 46413 ||  || — || April 10, 2002 || Socorro || LINEAR || V || align=right | 1.9 km || 
|-id=414 bgcolor=#d6d6d6
| 46414 ||  || — || April 11, 2002 || Anderson Mesa || LONEOS || EOS || align=right | 4.9 km || 
|-id=415 bgcolor=#E9E9E9
| 46415 ||  || — || April 12, 2002 || Socorro || LINEAR || — || align=right | 2.4 km || 
|-id=416 bgcolor=#E9E9E9
| 46416 || 2002 HK || — || April 16, 2002 || Desert Eagle || W. K. Y. Yeung || — || align=right | 2.5 km || 
|-id=417 bgcolor=#d6d6d6
| 46417 ||  || — || May 4, 2002 || Desert Eagle || W. K. Y. Yeung || — || align=right | 5.9 km || 
|-id=418 bgcolor=#fefefe
| 46418 ||  || — || May 6, 2002 || Desert Eagle || W. K. Y. Yeung || — || align=right | 3.1 km || 
|-id=419 bgcolor=#fefefe
| 46419 ||  || — || May 9, 2002 || Desert Eagle || W. K. Y. Yeung || FLO || align=right | 1.4 km || 
|-id=420 bgcolor=#E9E9E9
| 46420 ||  || — || May 8, 2002 || Socorro || LINEAR || GER || align=right | 2.9 km || 
|-id=421 bgcolor=#fefefe
| 46421 ||  || — || May 9, 2002 || Socorro || LINEAR || V || align=right | 1.8 km || 
|-id=422 bgcolor=#fefefe
| 46422 ||  || — || May 9, 2002 || Socorro || LINEAR || — || align=right | 4.3 km || 
|-id=423 bgcolor=#fefefe
| 46423 ||  || — || May 9, 2002 || Socorro || LINEAR || — || align=right | 3.7 km || 
|-id=424 bgcolor=#E9E9E9
| 46424 ||  || — || May 9, 2002 || Socorro || LINEAR || — || align=right | 2.7 km || 
|-id=425 bgcolor=#E9E9E9
| 46425 ||  || — || May 9, 2002 || Socorro || LINEAR || — || align=right | 3.1 km || 
|-id=426 bgcolor=#fefefe
| 46426 ||  || — || May 9, 2002 || Socorro || LINEAR || — || align=right | 4.0 km || 
|-id=427 bgcolor=#d6d6d6
| 46427 ||  || — || May 9, 2002 || Socorro || LINEAR || HYG || align=right | 8.1 km || 
|-id=428 bgcolor=#E9E9E9
| 46428 ||  || — || May 9, 2002 || Socorro || LINEAR || — || align=right | 1.9 km || 
|-id=429 bgcolor=#fefefe
| 46429 ||  || — || May 9, 2002 || Socorro || LINEAR || — || align=right | 1.7 km || 
|-id=430 bgcolor=#fefefe
| 46430 ||  || — || May 9, 2002 || Socorro || LINEAR || — || align=right | 1.5 km || 
|-id=431 bgcolor=#d6d6d6
| 46431 ||  || — || May 9, 2002 || Socorro || LINEAR || HYG || align=right | 8.0 km || 
|-id=432 bgcolor=#E9E9E9
| 46432 ||  || — || May 9, 2002 || Socorro || LINEAR || MIS || align=right | 4.6 km || 
|-id=433 bgcolor=#FA8072
| 46433 ||  || — || May 9, 2002 || Socorro || LINEAR || — || align=right | 2.4 km || 
|-id=434 bgcolor=#E9E9E9
| 46434 ||  || — || May 12, 2002 || Socorro || LINEAR || — || align=right | 3.3 km || 
|-id=435 bgcolor=#E9E9E9
| 46435 ||  || — || May 16, 2002 || Socorro || LINEAR || — || align=right | 2.3 km || 
|-id=436 bgcolor=#d6d6d6
| 46436 ||  || — || June 6, 2002 || Fountain Hills || C. W. Juels, P. R. Holvorcem || — || align=right | 15 km || 
|-id=437 bgcolor=#fefefe
| 46437 ||  || — || June 6, 2002 || Fountain Hills || C. W. Juels, P. R. Holvorcem || NYS || align=right | 1.9 km || 
|-id=438 bgcolor=#fefefe
| 46438 ||  || — || June 4, 2002 || Socorro || LINEAR || — || align=right | 1.9 km || 
|-id=439 bgcolor=#E9E9E9
| 46439 ||  || — || June 5, 2002 || Socorro || LINEAR || — || align=right | 3.4 km || 
|-id=440 bgcolor=#fefefe
| 46440 ||  || — || June 9, 2002 || Socorro || LINEAR || — || align=right | 2.4 km || 
|-id=441 bgcolor=#E9E9E9
| 46441 Mikepenston ||  ||  || June 10, 2002 || Fountain Hills || C. W. Juels, P. R. Holvorcem || EUN || align=right | 4.4 km || 
|-id=442 bgcolor=#d6d6d6
| 46442 Keithtritton ||  ||  || June 12, 2002 || Fountain Hills || C. W. Juels, P. R. Holvorcem || — || align=right | 14 km || 
|-id=443 bgcolor=#E9E9E9
| 46443 ||  || — || June 10, 2002 || Socorro || LINEAR || — || align=right | 4.5 km || 
|-id=444 bgcolor=#fefefe
| 46444 || 2089 P-L || — || September 24, 1960 || Palomar || PLS || — || align=right | 2.3 km || 
|-id=445 bgcolor=#fefefe
| 46445 || 2102 P-L || — || September 24, 1960 || Palomar || PLS || — || align=right | 2.2 km || 
|-id=446 bgcolor=#E9E9E9
| 46446 || 2110 P-L || — || September 24, 1960 || Palomar || PLS || — || align=right | 2.7 km || 
|-id=447 bgcolor=#E9E9E9
| 46447 || 2208 P-L || — || September 24, 1960 || Palomar || PLS || — || align=right | 2.9 km || 
|-id=448 bgcolor=#fefefe
| 46448 || 2829 P-L || — || September 24, 1960 || Palomar || PLS || — || align=right | 3.1 km || 
|-id=449 bgcolor=#fefefe
| 46449 || 3036 P-L || — || September 24, 1960 || Palomar || PLS || FLO || align=right | 1.9 km || 
|-id=450 bgcolor=#E9E9E9
| 46450 || 3039 P-L || — || September 24, 1960 || Palomar || PLS || DOR || align=right | 6.2 km || 
|-id=451 bgcolor=#d6d6d6
| 46451 || 3050 P-L || — || September 24, 1960 || Palomar || PLS || — || align=right | 11 km || 
|-id=452 bgcolor=#E9E9E9
| 46452 || 3097 P-L || — || September 24, 1960 || Palomar || PLS || DOR || align=right | 8.6 km || 
|-id=453 bgcolor=#E9E9E9
| 46453 || 4013 P-L || — || September 24, 1960 || Palomar || PLS || DOR || align=right | 6.6 km || 
|-id=454 bgcolor=#fefefe
| 46454 || 4029 P-L || — || September 24, 1960 || Palomar || PLS || — || align=right | 2.0 km || 
|-id=455 bgcolor=#E9E9E9
| 46455 || 4054 P-L || — || September 24, 1960 || Palomar || PLS || MRX || align=right | 3.4 km || 
|-id=456 bgcolor=#E9E9E9
| 46456 || 4140 P-L || — || September 24, 1960 || Palomar || PLS || EUN || align=right | 4.2 km || 
|-id=457 bgcolor=#d6d6d6
| 46457 || 4166 P-L || — || September 24, 1960 || Palomar || PLS || — || align=right | 5.6 km || 
|-id=458 bgcolor=#fefefe
| 46458 || 4244 P-L || — || September 24, 1960 || Palomar || PLS || — || align=right | 2.7 km || 
|-id=459 bgcolor=#d6d6d6
| 46459 || 4540 P-L || — || September 24, 1960 || Palomar || PLS || — || align=right | 9.9 km || 
|-id=460 bgcolor=#fefefe
| 46460 || 4798 P-L || — || September 24, 1960 || Palomar || PLS || NYS || align=right | 1.3 km || 
|-id=461 bgcolor=#d6d6d6
| 46461 || 6105 P-L || — || September 24, 1960 || Palomar || PLS || SAN || align=right | 4.0 km || 
|-id=462 bgcolor=#E9E9E9
| 46462 || 6179 P-L || — || September 24, 1960 || Palomar || PLS || — || align=right | 2.2 km || 
|-id=463 bgcolor=#fefefe
| 46463 || 6290 P-L || — || September 24, 1960 || Palomar || PLS || — || align=right | 1.6 km || 
|-id=464 bgcolor=#fefefe
| 46464 || 6602 P-L || — || September 24, 1960 || Palomar || PLS || — || align=right | 1.5 km || 
|-id=465 bgcolor=#fefefe
| 46465 || 6617 P-L || — || September 24, 1960 || Palomar || PLS || V || align=right | 2.3 km || 
|-id=466 bgcolor=#fefefe
| 46466 || 6622 P-L || — || September 24, 1960 || Palomar || PLS || NYS || align=right | 6.4 km || 
|-id=467 bgcolor=#d6d6d6
| 46467 || 6730 P-L || — || September 24, 1960 || Palomar || PLS || — || align=right | 5.5 km || 
|-id=468 bgcolor=#E9E9E9
| 46468 || 6887 P-L || — || September 24, 1960 || Palomar || PLS || — || align=right | 4.6 km || 
|-id=469 bgcolor=#fefefe
| 46469 || 9572 P-L || — || October 17, 1960 || Palomar || PLS || NYS || align=right | 4.9 km || 
|-id=470 bgcolor=#d6d6d6
| 46470 || 9607 P-L || — || October 17, 1960 || Palomar || PLS || — || align=right | 5.2 km || 
|-id=471 bgcolor=#d6d6d6
| 46471 || 1160 T-1 || — || March 25, 1971 || Palomar || PLS || EUP || align=right | 12 km || 
|-id=472 bgcolor=#d6d6d6
| 46472 || 2155 T-1 || — || March 25, 1971 || Palomar || PLS || — || align=right | 7.5 km || 
|-id=473 bgcolor=#fefefe
| 46473 || 3066 T-1 || — || March 26, 1971 || Palomar || PLS || — || align=right | 2.2 km || 
|-id=474 bgcolor=#fefefe
| 46474 || 3109 T-1 || — || March 26, 1971 || Palomar || PLS || — || align=right | 2.3 km || 
|-id=475 bgcolor=#fefefe
| 46475 || 3204 T-1 || — || March 26, 1971 || Palomar || PLS || V || align=right | 3.3 km || 
|-id=476 bgcolor=#fefefe
| 46476 || 4208 T-1 || — || March 26, 1971 || Palomar || PLS || — || align=right | 1.7 km || 
|-id=477 bgcolor=#fefefe
| 46477 || 4266 T-1 || — || March 26, 1971 || Palomar || PLS || NYS || align=right | 1.5 km || 
|-id=478 bgcolor=#E9E9E9
| 46478 || 1097 T-2 || — || September 29, 1973 || Palomar || PLS || — || align=right | 4.5 km || 
|-id=479 bgcolor=#fefefe
| 46479 || 1150 T-2 || — || September 29, 1973 || Palomar || PLS || — || align=right | 2.0 km || 
|-id=480 bgcolor=#E9E9E9
| 46480 || 1170 T-2 || — || September 29, 1973 || Palomar || PLS || — || align=right | 4.3 km || 
|-id=481 bgcolor=#E9E9E9
| 46481 || 1198 T-2 || — || September 29, 1973 || Palomar || PLS || — || align=right | 3.3 km || 
|-id=482 bgcolor=#d6d6d6
| 46482 || 1460 T-2 || — || September 30, 1973 || Palomar || PLS || — || align=right | 6.0 km || 
|-id=483 bgcolor=#E9E9E9
| 46483 || 1549 T-2 || — || September 24, 1973 || Palomar || PLS || — || align=right | 5.8 km || 
|-id=484 bgcolor=#fefefe
| 46484 || 2245 T-2 || — || September 29, 1973 || Palomar || PLS || NYS || align=right | 1.7 km || 
|-id=485 bgcolor=#d6d6d6
| 46485 || 2279 T-2 || — || September 29, 1973 || Palomar || PLS || — || align=right | 6.7 km || 
|-id=486 bgcolor=#E9E9E9
| 46486 || 3113 T-2 || — || September 30, 1973 || Palomar || PLS || — || align=right | 4.1 km || 
|-id=487 bgcolor=#E9E9E9
| 46487 || 3322 T-2 || — || September 25, 1973 || Palomar || PLS || — || align=right | 2.5 km || 
|-id=488 bgcolor=#E9E9E9
| 46488 || 3335 T-2 || — || September 24, 1973 || Palomar || PLS || — || align=right | 2.8 km || 
|-id=489 bgcolor=#E9E9E9
| 46489 || 4156 T-2 || — || September 29, 1973 || Palomar || PLS || — || align=right | 2.2 km || 
|-id=490 bgcolor=#fefefe
| 46490 || 4164 T-2 || — || September 29, 1973 || Palomar || PLS || NYS || align=right | 1.9 km || 
|-id=491 bgcolor=#d6d6d6
| 46491 || 5070 T-2 || — || September 25, 1973 || Palomar || PLS || — || align=right | 8.5 km || 
|-id=492 bgcolor=#fefefe
| 46492 || 1023 T-3 || — || October 17, 1977 || Palomar || PLS || — || align=right | 2.2 km || 
|-id=493 bgcolor=#d6d6d6
| 46493 || 1032 T-3 || — || October 17, 1977 || Palomar || PLS || EOS || align=right | 6.4 km || 
|-id=494 bgcolor=#E9E9E9
| 46494 || 1088 T-3 || — || October 17, 1977 || Palomar || PLS || — || align=right | 3.1 km || 
|-id=495 bgcolor=#d6d6d6
| 46495 || 1123 T-3 || — || October 17, 1977 || Palomar || PLS || TEL || align=right | 4.0 km || 
|-id=496 bgcolor=#d6d6d6
| 46496 || 1157 T-3 || — || October 17, 1977 || Palomar || PLS || EOS || align=right | 5.9 km || 
|-id=497 bgcolor=#fefefe
| 46497 || 2214 T-3 || — || October 17, 1977 || Palomar || PLS || V || align=right | 2.9 km || 
|-id=498 bgcolor=#fefefe
| 46498 || 2240 T-3 || — || October 16, 1977 || Palomar || PLS || — || align=right | 2.3 km || 
|-id=499 bgcolor=#fefefe
| 46499 || 2409 T-3 || — || October 16, 1977 || Palomar || PLS || NYS || align=right | 3.3 km || 
|-id=500 bgcolor=#fefefe
| 46500 || 2610 T-3 || — || October 16, 1977 || Palomar || PLS || NYS || align=right | 1.9 km || 
|}

46501–46600 

|-bgcolor=#fefefe
| 46501 || 2616 T-3 || — || October 16, 1977 || Palomar || PLS || V || align=right | 2.1 km || 
|-id=502 bgcolor=#fefefe
| 46502 || 3084 T-3 || — || October 16, 1977 || Palomar || PLS || — || align=right | 1.3 km || 
|-id=503 bgcolor=#fefefe
| 46503 || 3191 T-3 || — || October 16, 1977 || Palomar || PLS || V || align=right | 1.4 km || 
|-id=504 bgcolor=#fefefe
| 46504 || 3194 T-3 || — || October 16, 1977 || Palomar || PLS || V || align=right | 2.1 km || 
|-id=505 bgcolor=#E9E9E9
| 46505 || 3195 T-3 || — || October 16, 1977 || Palomar || PLS || ADE || align=right | 4.6 km || 
|-id=506 bgcolor=#fefefe
| 46506 || 3387 T-3 || — || October 16, 1977 || Palomar || PLS || — || align=right | 1.7 km || 
|-id=507 bgcolor=#E9E9E9
| 46507 || 3479 T-3 || — || October 16, 1977 || Palomar || PLS || — || align=right | 2.1 km || 
|-id=508 bgcolor=#d6d6d6
| 46508 || 3554 T-3 || — || October 16, 1977 || Palomar || PLS || — || align=right | 6.0 km || 
|-id=509 bgcolor=#fefefe
| 46509 || 4149 T-3 || — || October 16, 1977 || Palomar || PLS || NYS || align=right | 1.7 km || 
|-id=510 bgcolor=#fefefe
| 46510 || 4323 T-3 || — || October 16, 1977 || Palomar || PLS || — || align=right | 1.9 km || 
|-id=511 bgcolor=#d6d6d6
| 46511 || 4356 T-3 || — || October 16, 1977 || Palomar || PLS || EOS || align=right | 5.4 km || 
|-id=512 bgcolor=#E9E9E9
| 46512 || 1951 QD || — || August 31, 1951 || Mount Wilson || L. E. Cunningham || DOR || align=right | 8.2 km || 
|-id=513 bgcolor=#fefefe
| 46513 Ampzing || 1972 FC ||  || March 16, 1972 || Palomar || T. Gehrels || H || align=right | 1.6 km || 
|-id=514 bgcolor=#fefefe
| 46514 Lasswitz || 1977 JA ||  || May 15, 1977 || La Silla || H.-E. Schuster || PHO || align=right | 2.2 km || 
|-id=515 bgcolor=#fefefe
| 46515 ||  || — || November 7, 1978 || Palomar || E. F. Helin, S. J. Bus || — || align=right | 2.8 km || 
|-id=516 bgcolor=#d6d6d6
| 46516 ||  || — || November 6, 1978 || Palomar || E. F. Helin, S. J. Bus || KOR || align=right | 3.6 km || 
|-id=517 bgcolor=#E9E9E9
| 46517 ||  || — || November 7, 1978 || Palomar || E. F. Helin, S. J. Bus || — || align=right | 2.4 km || 
|-id=518 bgcolor=#d6d6d6
| 46518 ||  || — || November 6, 1978 || Palomar || E. F. Helin, S. J. Bus || KOR || align=right | 4.3 km || 
|-id=519 bgcolor=#d6d6d6
| 46519 ||  || — || June 25, 1979 || Siding Spring || E. F. Helin, S. J. Bus || HYG || align=right | 5.7 km || 
|-id=520 bgcolor=#E9E9E9
| 46520 ||  || — || June 25, 1979 || Siding Spring || E. F. Helin, S. J. Bus || PAD || align=right | 6.2 km || 
|-id=521 bgcolor=#fefefe
| 46521 ||  || — || June 25, 1979 || Siding Spring || E. F. Helin, S. J. Bus || — || align=right | 1.3 km || 
|-id=522 bgcolor=#E9E9E9
| 46522 ||  || — || June 25, 1979 || Siding Spring || E. F. Helin, S. J. Bus || — || align=right | 3.0 km || 
|-id=523 bgcolor=#d6d6d6
| 46523 ||  || — || July 24, 1979 || Siding Spring || S. J. Bus || — || align=right | 7.8 km || 
|-id=524 bgcolor=#E9E9E9
| 46524 ||  || — || August 22, 1979 || La Silla || C.-I. Lagerkvist || XIZ || align=right | 3.2 km || 
|-id=525 bgcolor=#E9E9E9
| 46525 ||  || — || October 31, 1980 || Palomar || S. J. Bus || — || align=right | 6.6 km || 
|-id=526 bgcolor=#fefefe
| 46526 ||  || — || March 2, 1981 || Siding Spring || S. J. Bus || — || align=right | 2.1 km || 
|-id=527 bgcolor=#fefefe
| 46527 ||  || — || March 6, 1981 || Siding Spring || S. J. Bus || — || align=right | 1.8 km || 
|-id=528 bgcolor=#fefefe
| 46528 ||  || — || March 1, 1981 || Siding Spring || S. J. Bus || — || align=right | 2.9 km || 
|-id=529 bgcolor=#fefefe
| 46529 ||  || — || March 1, 1981 || Siding Spring || S. J. Bus || FLO || align=right | 1.9 km || 
|-id=530 bgcolor=#fefefe
| 46530 ||  || — || March 1, 1981 || Siding Spring || S. J. Bus || — || align=right | 2.0 km || 
|-id=531 bgcolor=#fefefe
| 46531 ||  || — || March 7, 1981 || Siding Spring || S. J. Bus || — || align=right | 1.7 km || 
|-id=532 bgcolor=#fefefe
| 46532 ||  || — || March 1, 1981 || Siding Spring || S. J. Bus || FLO || align=right | 2.4 km || 
|-id=533 bgcolor=#fefefe
| 46533 ||  || — || March 3, 1981 || Siding Spring || S. J. Bus || — || align=right | 4.3 km || 
|-id=534 bgcolor=#fefefe
| 46534 ||  || — || March 2, 1981 || Siding Spring || S. J. Bus || — || align=right | 1.9 km || 
|-id=535 bgcolor=#fefefe
| 46535 ||  || — || March 3, 1981 || Siding Spring || S. J. Bus || NYS || align=right | 2.0 km || 
|-id=536 bgcolor=#E9E9E9
| 46536 ||  || — || March 2, 1981 || Siding Spring || S. J. Bus || PAL || align=right | 4.8 km || 
|-id=537 bgcolor=#d6d6d6
| 46537 ||  || — || March 1, 1981 || Siding Spring || S. J. Bus || — || align=right | 5.9 km || 
|-id=538 bgcolor=#d6d6d6
| 46538 ||  || — || October 25, 1981 || Palomar || S. J. Bus || ANF || align=right | 9.3 km || 
|-id=539 bgcolor=#E9E9E9
| 46539 Viktortikhonov ||  ||  || October 24, 1982 || Nauchnij || L. V. Zhuravleva || — || align=right | 5.7 km || 
|-id=540 bgcolor=#fefefe
| 46540 || 1983 LD || — || June 13, 1983 || Palomar || E. F. Helin, R. S. Dunbar || H || align=right | 1.7 km || 
|-id=541 bgcolor=#d6d6d6
| 46541 ||  || — || September 23, 1984 || La Silla || H. Debehogne || — || align=right | 4.9 km || 
|-id=542 bgcolor=#E9E9E9
| 46542 || 1987 AD || — || January 4, 1987 || Palomar || Palomar Obs. || BRU || align=right | 6.4 km || 
|-id=543 bgcolor=#fefefe
| 46543 ||  || — || February 23, 1987 || La Silla || H. Debehogne || — || align=right | 3.2 km || 
|-id=544 bgcolor=#fefefe
| 46544 || 1988 QO || — || August 19, 1988 || Siding Spring || R. H. McNaught || — || align=right | 1.9 km || 
|-id=545 bgcolor=#E9E9E9
| 46545 ||  || — || September 14, 1988 || Cerro Tololo || S. J. Bus || — || align=right | 5.0 km || 
|-id=546 bgcolor=#E9E9E9
| 46546 ||  || — || November 4, 1988 || Kleť || A. Mrkos || — || align=right | 5.7 km || 
|-id=547 bgcolor=#d6d6d6
| 46547 ||  || — || April 3, 1989 || La Silla || E. W. Elst || — || align=right | 9.2 km || 
|-id=548 bgcolor=#E9E9E9
| 46548 ||  || — || September 26, 1989 || La Silla || E. W. Elst || — || align=right | 5.9 km || 
|-id=549 bgcolor=#E9E9E9
| 46549 ||  || — || September 26, 1989 || La Silla || E. W. Elst || — || align=right | 5.1 km || 
|-id=550 bgcolor=#E9E9E9
| 46550 ||  || — || September 26, 1989 || Calar Alto || J. M. Baur, K. Birkle || — || align=right | 3.6 km || 
|-id=551 bgcolor=#E9E9E9
| 46551 ||  || — || October 7, 1989 || La Silla || E. W. Elst || — || align=right | 4.3 km || 
|-id=552 bgcolor=#E9E9E9
| 46552 ||  || — || September 14, 1990 || Palomar || H. E. Holt || EUN || align=right | 3.6 km || 
|-id=553 bgcolor=#E9E9E9
| 46553 ||  || — || September 14, 1990 || La Silla || E. W. Elst || — || align=right | 1.8 km || 
|-id=554 bgcolor=#d6d6d6
| 46554 ||  || — || September 22, 1990 || La Silla || E. W. Elst || — || align=right | 3.8 km || 
|-id=555 bgcolor=#E9E9E9
| 46555 ||  || — || November 11, 1990 || Oohira || T. Urata || — || align=right | 3.3 km || 
|-id=556 bgcolor=#fefefe
| 46556 ||  || — || March 22, 1991 || La Silla || H. Debehogne || FLO || align=right | 3.1 km || 
|-id=557 bgcolor=#E9E9E9
| 46557 ||  || — || March 22, 1991 || La Silla || H. Debehogne || PAD || align=right | 8.5 km || 
|-id=558 bgcolor=#fefefe
| 46558 ||  || — || April 8, 1991 || La Silla || E. W. Elst || — || align=right | 1.7 km || 
|-id=559 bgcolor=#fefefe
| 46559 ||  || — || August 15, 1991 || Palomar || E. F. Helin || H || align=right | 1.4 km || 
|-id=560 bgcolor=#fefefe
| 46560 ||  || — || August 2, 1991 || La Silla || E. W. Elst || — || align=right | 2.2 km || 
|-id=561 bgcolor=#fefefe
| 46561 || 1991 RQ || — || September 7, 1991 || Palomar || E. F. Helin || — || align=right | 4.7 km || 
|-id=562 bgcolor=#fefefe
| 46562 || 1991 RV || — || September 7, 1991 || Palomar || E. F. Helin || NYS || align=right | 2.1 km || 
|-id=563 bgcolor=#d6d6d6
| 46563 Oken ||  ||  || September 12, 1991 || Tautenburg Observatory || F. Börngen, L. D. Schmadel || — || align=right | 9.0 km || 
|-id=564 bgcolor=#d6d6d6
| 46564 ||  || — || September 10, 1991 || Palomar || H. E. Holt || URS || align=right | 22 km || 
|-id=565 bgcolor=#fefefe
| 46565 ||  || — || September 15, 1991 || Palomar || H. E. Holt || V || align=right | 2.2 km || 
|-id=566 bgcolor=#fefefe
| 46566 ||  || — || September 11, 1991 || Palomar || H. E. Holt || CHLfast? || align=right | 6.5 km || 
|-id=567 bgcolor=#fefefe
| 46567 ||  || — || September 11, 1991 || Palomar || H. E. Holt || — || align=right | 2.5 km || 
|-id=568 bgcolor=#fefefe
| 46568 Stevenlee || 1991 SL ||  || September 30, 1991 || Siding Spring || R. H. McNaught || H || align=right | 2.1 km || 
|-id=569 bgcolor=#fefefe
| 46569 ||  || — || September 16, 1991 || Palomar || H. E. Holt || — || align=right | 2.7 km || 
|-id=570 bgcolor=#fefefe
| 46570 ||  || — || October 1, 1991 || Kitt Peak || Spacewatch || — || align=right | 2.8 km || 
|-id=571 bgcolor=#fefefe
| 46571 ||  || — || November 4, 1991 || Kushiro || S. Ueda, H. Kaneda || — || align=right | 3.0 km || 
|-id=572 bgcolor=#fefefe
| 46572 ||  || — || November 4, 1991 || Dynic || A. Sugie || — || align=right | 4.6 km || 
|-id=573 bgcolor=#E9E9E9
| 46573 ||  || — || January 10, 1992 || Dynic || A. Sugie || — || align=right | 5.8 km || 
|-id=574 bgcolor=#E9E9E9
| 46574 ||  || — || February 29, 1992 || La Silla || UESAC || — || align=right | 2.0 km || 
|-id=575 bgcolor=#E9E9E9
| 46575 ||  || — || February 29, 1992 || La Silla || UESAC || — || align=right | 3.0 km || 
|-id=576 bgcolor=#E9E9E9
| 46576 ||  || — || March 2, 1992 || La Silla || UESAC || — || align=right | 4.9 km || 
|-id=577 bgcolor=#E9E9E9
| 46577 ||  || — || March 6, 1992 || La Silla || UESAC || — || align=right | 2.6 km || 
|-id=578 bgcolor=#E9E9E9
| 46578 ||  || — || March 2, 1992 || La Silla || UESAC || VIB || align=right | 4.5 km || 
|-id=579 bgcolor=#E9E9E9
| 46579 ||  || — || March 8, 1992 || La Silla || UESAC || — || align=right | 3.0 km || 
|-id=580 bgcolor=#E9E9E9
| 46580 Ryouichiirie || 1992 GC ||  || April 2, 1992 || Geisei || T. Seki || EUN || align=right | 4.3 km || 
|-id=581 bgcolor=#d6d6d6
| 46581 ||  || — || July 26, 1992 || La Silla || E. W. Elst || — || align=right | 8.0 km || 
|-id=582 bgcolor=#fefefe
| 46582 ||  || — || September 2, 1992 || La Silla || E. W. Elst || FLO || align=right | 2.0 km || 
|-id=583 bgcolor=#d6d6d6
| 46583 ||  || — || September 2, 1992 || La Silla || E. W. Elst || KOR || align=right | 3.6 km || 
|-id=584 bgcolor=#d6d6d6
| 46584 ||  || — || September 2, 1992 || La Silla || E. W. Elst || EOS || align=right | 4.9 km || 
|-id=585 bgcolor=#d6d6d6
| 46585 ||  || — || September 2, 1992 || La Silla || E. W. Elst || — || align=right | 7.9 km || 
|-id=586 bgcolor=#fefefe
| 46586 ||  || — || September 26, 1992 || Kitt Peak || Spacewatch || — || align=right | 1.4 km || 
|-id=587 bgcolor=#fefefe
| 46587 ||  || — || October 22, 1992 || Kushiro || S. Ueda, H. Kaneda || — || align=right | 2.1 km || 
|-id=588 bgcolor=#fefefe
| 46588 || 1992 WR || — || November 16, 1992 || Kitami || K. Endate, K. Watanabe || FLO || align=right | 2.6 km || 
|-id=589 bgcolor=#fefefe
| 46589 || 1992 WU || — || November 16, 1992 || Kitami || K. Endate, K. Watanabe || FLO || align=right | 3.0 km || 
|-id=590 bgcolor=#d6d6d6
| 46590 ||  || — || November 17, 1992 || Kitami || K. Endate, K. Watanabe || — || align=right | 9.1 km || 
|-id=591 bgcolor=#d6d6d6
| 46591 ||  || — || November 18, 1992 || Dynic || A. Sugie || — || align=right | 14 km || 
|-id=592 bgcolor=#fefefe
| 46592 Marinawatanabe || 1992 YP ||  || December 16, 1992 || Geisei || T. Seki || FLO || align=right | 2.7 km || 
|-id=593 bgcolor=#fefefe
| 46593 ||  || — || December 18, 1992 || Caussols || E. W. Elst || FLO || align=right | 2.5 km || 
|-id=594 bgcolor=#d6d6d6
| 46594 ||  || — || December 24, 1992 || Kitt Peak || Spacewatch || — || align=right | 8.4 km || 
|-id=595 bgcolor=#fefefe
| 46595 Kita-Kyushu ||  ||  || December 29, 1992 || Geisei || T. Seki || — || align=right | 2.1 km || 
|-id=596 bgcolor=#fefefe
| 46596 Tobata || 1993 BD ||  || January 16, 1993 || Geisei || T. Seki || — || align=right | 3.2 km || 
|-id=597 bgcolor=#E9E9E9
| 46597 ||  || — || February 24, 1993 || Siding Spring || R. H. McNaught || — || align=right | 2.7 km || 
|-id=598 bgcolor=#FA8072
| 46598 ||  || — || March 19, 1993 || Palomar || E. F. Helin || PHO || align=right | 4.8 km || 
|-id=599 bgcolor=#fefefe
| 46599 ||  || — || March 17, 1993 || La Silla || UESAC || NYS || align=right | 5.6 km || 
|-id=600 bgcolor=#E9E9E9
| 46600 ||  || — || March 17, 1993 || La Silla || UESAC || RAF || align=right | 2.8 km || 
|}

46601–46700 

|-bgcolor=#fefefe
| 46601 ||  || — || March 17, 1993 || La Silla || UESAC || — || align=right | 2.2 km || 
|-id=602 bgcolor=#d6d6d6
| 46602 ||  || — || March 19, 1993 || La Silla || UESAC || — || align=right | 9.2 km || 
|-id=603 bgcolor=#fefefe
| 46603 ||  || — || March 19, 1993 || La Silla || UESAC || — || align=right | 3.2 km || 
|-id=604 bgcolor=#E9E9E9
| 46604 ||  || — || March 17, 1993 || La Silla || UESAC || — || align=right | 3.8 km || 
|-id=605 bgcolor=#fefefe
| 46605 ||  || — || April 18, 1993 || Siding Spring || R. H. McNaught || H || align=right | 1.3 km || 
|-id=606 bgcolor=#E9E9E9
| 46606 ||  || — || June 13, 1993 || Kitt Peak || Spacewatch || — || align=right | 2.4 km || 
|-id=607 bgcolor=#E9E9E9
| 46607 ||  || — || July 19, 1993 || La Silla || E. W. Elst || MAR || align=right | 5.8 km || 
|-id=608 bgcolor=#E9E9E9
| 46608 ||  || — || September 12, 1993 || Kitami || K. Endate, K. Watanabe || — || align=right | 4.9 km || 
|-id=609 bgcolor=#E9E9E9
| 46609 ||  || — || September 16, 1993 || Kitami || K. Endate, K. Watanabe || GEF || align=right | 5.0 km || 
|-id=610 bgcolor=#fefefe
| 46610 Bésixdouze ||  ||  || October 15, 1993 || Kitami || K. Endate, K. Watanabe || — || align=right | 2.1 km || 
|-id=611 bgcolor=#E9E9E9
| 46611 ||  || — || October 8, 1993 || Kitt Peak || Spacewatch || AGN || align=right | 4.3 km || 
|-id=612 bgcolor=#E9E9E9
| 46612 ||  || — || October 9, 1993 || La Silla || E. W. Elst || — || align=right | 5.9 km || 
|-id=613 bgcolor=#E9E9E9
| 46613 ||  || — || October 9, 1993 || La Silla || E. W. Elst || — || align=right | 6.2 km || 
|-id=614 bgcolor=#E9E9E9
| 46614 ||  || — || October 9, 1993 || La Silla || E. W. Elst || — || align=right | 7.1 km || 
|-id=615 bgcolor=#d6d6d6
| 46615 ||  || — || October 9, 1993 || La Silla || E. W. Elst || — || align=right | 5.5 km || 
|-id=616 bgcolor=#d6d6d6
| 46616 || 1994 AM || — || January 2, 1994 || Oizumi || T. Kobayashi || — || align=right | 7.6 km || 
|-id=617 bgcolor=#fefefe
| 46617 ||  || — || January 19, 1994 || Oizumi || T. Kobayashi || FLO || align=right | 2.4 km || 
|-id=618 bgcolor=#d6d6d6
| 46618 ||  || — || February 8, 1994 || La Silla || E. W. Elst || — || align=right | 8.2 km || 
|-id=619 bgcolor=#fefefe
| 46619 ||  || — || February 8, 1994 || La Silla || E. W. Elst || NYS || align=right | 1.5 km || 
|-id=620 bgcolor=#fefefe
| 46620 ||  || — || March 6, 1994 || Oizumi || T. Kobayashi || — || align=right | 3.9 km || 
|-id=621 bgcolor=#fefefe
| 46621 ||  || — || March 9, 1994 || Caussols || E. W. Elst || FLO || align=right | 2.3 km || 
|-id=622 bgcolor=#fefefe
| 46622 ||  || — || March 9, 1994 || Caussols || E. W. Elst || FLO || align=right | 1.9 km || 
|-id=623 bgcolor=#fefefe
| 46623 ||  || — || April 14, 1994 || Palomar || PCAS || — || align=right | 5.1 km || 
|-id=624 bgcolor=#fefefe
| 46624 ||  || — || May 4, 1994 || Kitt Peak || Spacewatch || — || align=right | 2.0 km || 
|-id=625 bgcolor=#fefefe
| 46625 || 1994 LM || — || June 5, 1994 || Kitt Peak || Spacewatch || H || align=right | 1.4 km || 
|-id=626 bgcolor=#E9E9E9
| 46626 ||  || — || August 12, 1994 || La Silla || E. W. Elst || — || align=right | 3.2 km || 
|-id=627 bgcolor=#fefefe
| 46627 ||  || — || August 12, 1994 || La Silla || E. W. Elst || MAS || align=right | 2.7 km || 
|-id=628 bgcolor=#E9E9E9
| 46628 ||  || — || August 12, 1994 || La Silla || E. W. Elst || — || align=right | 5.0 km || 
|-id=629 bgcolor=#d6d6d6
| 46629 ||  || — || August 10, 1994 || La Silla || E. W. Elst || SHU3:2 || align=right | 16 km || 
|-id=630 bgcolor=#E9E9E9
| 46630 ||  || — || September 29, 1994 || Kitt Peak || Spacewatch || — || align=right | 1.7 km || 
|-id=631 bgcolor=#E9E9E9
| 46631 ||  || — || October 5, 1994 || Kitami || K. Endate, K. Watanabe || — || align=right | 12 km || 
|-id=632 bgcolor=#E9E9E9
| 46632 RISE ||  ||  || October 14, 1994 || Kiso || I. Satō, H. Araki || — || align=right | 3.1 km || 
|-id=633 bgcolor=#E9E9E9
| 46633 ||  || — || November 4, 1994 || Oizumi || T. Kobayashi || — || align=right | 3.6 km || 
|-id=634 bgcolor=#E9E9E9
| 46634 ||  || — || November 1, 1994 || Kitami || K. Endate, K. Watanabe || — || align=right | 5.6 km || 
|-id=635 bgcolor=#E9E9E9
| 46635 ||  || — || November 28, 1994 || Kushiro || S. Ueda, H. Kaneda || CLO || align=right | 7.9 km || 
|-id=636 bgcolor=#E9E9E9
| 46636 ||  || — || November 28, 1994 || Kushiro || S. Ueda, H. Kaneda || EUN || align=right | 3.1 km || 
|-id=637 bgcolor=#E9E9E9
| 46637 ||  || — || November 27, 1994 || Caussols || E. W. Elst || — || align=right | 4.8 km || 
|-id=638 bgcolor=#E9E9E9
| 46638 ||  || — || January 31, 1995 || Oizumi || T. Kobayashi || — || align=right | 5.9 km || 
|-id=639 bgcolor=#E9E9E9
| 46639 ||  || — || January 28, 1995 || Kushiro || S. Ueda, H. Kaneda || ADE || align=right | 10 km || 
|-id=640 bgcolor=#d6d6d6
| 46640 || 1995 DU || — || February 20, 1995 || Oizumi || T. Kobayashi || — || align=right | 5.7 km || 
|-id=641 bgcolor=#E9E9E9
| 46641 || 1995 EY || — || March 5, 1995 || Kushiro || S. Ueda, H. Kaneda || — || align=right | 4.3 km || 
|-id=642 bgcolor=#d6d6d6
| 46642 ||  || — || March 23, 1995 || Kitt Peak || Spacewatch || — || align=right | 4.5 km || 
|-id=643 bgcolor=#d6d6d6
| 46643 Yanase || 1995 KM ||  || May 23, 1995 || Kuma Kogen || A. Nakamura || EOS || align=right | 6.0 km || 
|-id=644 bgcolor=#fefefe
| 46644 Lagia || 1995 OF ||  || July 19, 1995 || San Marcello || A. Boattini, L. Tesi || V || align=right | 1.2 km || 
|-id=645 bgcolor=#d6d6d6
| 46645 ||  || — || July 19, 1995 || Xinglong || SCAP || — || align=right | 7.0 km || 
|-id=646 bgcolor=#fefefe
| 46646 ||  || — || July 25, 1995 || Kitt Peak || Spacewatch || FLO || align=right | 3.0 km || 
|-id=647 bgcolor=#fefefe
| 46647 ||  || — || August 28, 1995 || Nachi-Katsuura || Y. Shimizu, T. Urata || FLO || align=right | 2.0 km || 
|-id=648 bgcolor=#fefefe
| 46648 || 1995 SY || — || September 22, 1995 || Stroncone || A. Vagnozzi || — || align=right | 1.9 km || 
|-id=649 bgcolor=#fefefe
| 46649 ||  || — || September 20, 1995 || Kitami || K. Endate, K. Watanabe || — || align=right | 3.6 km || 
|-id=650 bgcolor=#fefefe
| 46650 ||  || — || September 18, 1995 || Kitt Peak || Spacewatch || NYS || align=right | 1.7 km || 
|-id=651 bgcolor=#fefefe
| 46651 ||  || — || September 19, 1995 || Kitt Peak || Spacewatch || NYS || align=right | 1.3 km || 
|-id=652 bgcolor=#E9E9E9
| 46652 ||  || — || September 20, 1995 || Kitt Peak || Spacewatch || MRX || align=right | 1.8 km || 
|-id=653 bgcolor=#fefefe
| 46653 ||  || — || September 21, 1995 || Kitt Peak || Spacewatch || V || align=right | 1.8 km || 
|-id=654 bgcolor=#fefefe
| 46654 ||  || — || October 26, 1995 || Nachi-Katsuura || Y. Shimizu, T. Urata || — || align=right | 5.3 km || 
|-id=655 bgcolor=#fefefe
| 46655 ||  || — || October 16, 1995 || Kitt Peak || Spacewatch || — || align=right | 1.8 km || 
|-id=656 bgcolor=#fefefe
| 46656 ||  || — || November 28, 1995 || Stroncone || A. Vagnozzi || — || align=right | 2.9 km || 
|-id=657 bgcolor=#fefefe
| 46657 ||  || — || November 17, 1995 || Kitt Peak || Spacewatch || NYS || align=right | 1.5 km || 
|-id=658 bgcolor=#fefefe
| 46658 ||  || — || December 19, 1995 || Kitt Peak || Spacewatch || NYS || align=right | 1.8 km || 
|-id=659 bgcolor=#E9E9E9
| 46659 ||  || — || January 16, 1996 || Kitt Peak || Spacewatch || — || align=right | 7.4 km || 
|-id=660 bgcolor=#E9E9E9
| 46660 ||  || — || January 25, 1996 || Socorro || Lincoln Lab ETS || — || align=right | 3.0 km || 
|-id=661 bgcolor=#E9E9E9
| 46661 ||  || — || February 12, 1996 || Oizumi || T. Kobayashi || — || align=right | 3.2 km || 
|-id=662 bgcolor=#E9E9E9
| 46662 || 1996 DO || — || February 19, 1996 || Oizumi || T. Kobayashi || — || align=right | 5.3 km || 
|-id=663 bgcolor=#E9E9E9
| 46663 ||  || — || February 26, 1996 || Kleť || Kleť Obs. || — || align=right | 3.8 km || 
|-id=664 bgcolor=#E9E9E9
| 46664 ||  || — || March 12, 1996 || Kitt Peak || Spacewatch || — || align=right | 3.0 km || 
|-id=665 bgcolor=#E9E9E9
| 46665 || 1996 FD || — || March 16, 1996 || Haleakala || NEAT || — || align=right | 5.3 km || 
|-id=666 bgcolor=#d6d6d6
| 46666 ||  || — || March 24, 1996 || La Silla || E. W. Elst || — || align=right | 5.5 km || 
|-id=667 bgcolor=#E9E9E9
| 46667 ||  || — || April 18, 1996 || Siding Spring || R. H. McNaught || MIS || align=right | 8.5 km || 
|-id=668 bgcolor=#E9E9E9
| 46668 ||  || — || April 17, 1996 || La Silla || E. W. Elst || JUN || align=right | 3.2 km || 
|-id=669 bgcolor=#d6d6d6
| 46669 Wangyongzhi || 1996 LK ||  || June 6, 1996 || Xinglong || SCAP || — || align=right | 8.7 km || 
|-id=670 bgcolor=#d6d6d6
| 46670 || 1996 NU || — || July 15, 1996 || Lime Creek || R. Linderholm || URS || align=right | 20 km || 
|-id=671 bgcolor=#d6d6d6
| 46671 ||  || — || July 14, 1996 || La Silla || E. W. Elst || THM || align=right | 4.9 km || 
|-id=672 bgcolor=#d6d6d6
| 46672 || 1996 OA || — || July 16, 1996 || Kleť || Kleť Obs. || — || align=right | 8.6 km || 
|-id=673 bgcolor=#d6d6d6
| 46673 ||  || — || July 23, 1996 || Campo Imperatore || A. Boattini, A. Di Paola || — || align=right | 8.1 km || 
|-id=674 bgcolor=#d6d6d6
| 46674 ||  || — || August 8, 1996 || La Silla || E. W. Elst || — || align=right | 4.3 km || 
|-id=675 bgcolor=#d6d6d6
| 46675 || 1996 QO || — || August 17, 1996 || Haleakala || NEAT || THM || align=right | 8.0 km || 
|-id=676 bgcolor=#C2FFFF
| 46676 ||  || — || September 11, 1996 || La Silla || UDTS || L4 || align=right | 18 km || 
|-id=677 bgcolor=#d6d6d6
| 46677 ||  || — || October 7, 1996 || Xinglong || SCAP || — || align=right | 6.8 km || 
|-id=678 bgcolor=#d6d6d6
| 46678 ||  || — || October 12, 1996 || Catalina Station || T. B. Spahr || ALA || align=right | 15 km || 
|-id=679 bgcolor=#fefefe
| 46679 ||  || — || October 7, 1996 || Kitt Peak || Spacewatch || — || align=right | 2.7 km || 
|-id=680 bgcolor=#fefefe
| 46680 || 1996 YV || — || December 20, 1996 || Oizumi || T. Kobayashi || FLO || align=right | 2.0 km || 
|-id=681 bgcolor=#fefefe
| 46681 ||  || — || January 7, 1997 || Oizumi || T. Kobayashi || FLO || align=right | 2.7 km || 
|-id=682 bgcolor=#fefefe
| 46682 ||  || — || January 1, 1997 || Xinglong || SCAP || FLO || align=right | 2.4 km || 
|-id=683 bgcolor=#fefefe
| 46683 ||  || — || January 2, 1997 || Kitt Peak || Spacewatch || — || align=right | 1.8 km || 
|-id=684 bgcolor=#fefefe
| 46684 ||  || — || January 2, 1997 || Kitt Peak || Spacewatch || — || align=right | 1.8 km || 
|-id=685 bgcolor=#fefefe
| 46685 ||  || — || January 11, 1997 || Oizumi || T. Kobayashi || — || align=right | 3.2 km || 
|-id=686 bgcolor=#fefefe
| 46686 Anitasohus ||  ||  || January 10, 1997 || Haleakala || NEAT || — || align=right | 2.2 km || 
|-id=687 bgcolor=#fefefe
| 46687 ||  || — || January 15, 1997 || Farra d'Isonzo || Farra d'Isonzo || NYS || align=right | 1.7 km || 
|-id=688 bgcolor=#fefefe
| 46688 ||  || — || January 10, 1997 || Kitt Peak || Spacewatch || NYS || align=right | 2.1 km || 
|-id=689 bgcolor=#fefefe
| 46689 Hakuryuko ||  ||  || January 13, 1997 || Nanyo || T. Okuni || — || align=right | 2.9 km || 
|-id=690 bgcolor=#fefefe
| 46690 ||  || — || January 14, 1997 || Church Stretton || S. P. Laurie || — || align=right | 1.8 km || 
|-id=691 bgcolor=#fefefe
| 46691 Ghezzi ||  ||  || January 30, 1997 || Sormano || P. Sicoli, V. Giuliani || EUT || align=right | 2.1 km || 
|-id=692 bgcolor=#fefefe
| 46692 Taormina ||  ||  || February 2, 1997 || Kleť || J. Tichá, M. Tichý || — || align=right | 3.0 km || 
|-id=693 bgcolor=#fefefe
| 46693 ||  || — || February 4, 1997 || Oizumi || T. Kobayashi || V || align=right | 2.5 km || 
|-id=694 bgcolor=#fefefe
| 46694 ||  || — || February 1, 1997 || Kitt Peak || Spacewatch || V || align=right | 1.3 km || 
|-id=695 bgcolor=#fefefe
| 46695 ||  || — || February 4, 1997 || Cloudcroft || W. Offutt || — || align=right | 2.0 km || 
|-id=696 bgcolor=#fefefe
| 46696 ||  || — || February 12, 1997 || Oizumi || T. Kobayashi || V || align=right | 1.8 km || 
|-id=697 bgcolor=#fefefe
| 46697 ||  || — || February 12, 1997 || Oizumi || T. Kobayashi || NYS || align=right | 1.9 km || 
|-id=698 bgcolor=#fefefe
| 46698 ||  || — || February 13, 1997 || Kitt Peak || Spacewatch || V || align=right | 1.8 km || 
|-id=699 bgcolor=#fefefe
| 46699 ||  || — || February 14, 1997 || Oizumi || T. Kobayashi || — || align=right | 2.9 km || 
|-id=700 bgcolor=#fefefe
| 46700 ||  || — || February 8, 1997 || Haleakala || NEAT || FLO || align=right | 1.8 km || 
|}

46701–46800 

|-bgcolor=#fefefe
| 46701 Interrante ||  ||  || February 7, 1997 || Cima Ekar || U. Munari, M. Tombelli || — || align=right | 2.6 km || 
|-id=702 bgcolor=#fefefe
| 46702 Linapucci || 1997 DX ||  || February 28, 1997 || Montelupo || M. Tombelli, G. Forti || — || align=right | 2.3 km || 
|-id=703 bgcolor=#fefefe
| 46703 || 1997 EC || — || March 1, 1997 || Oizumi || T. Kobayashi || — || align=right | 2.9 km || 
|-id=704 bgcolor=#fefefe
| 46704 ||  || — || March 4, 1997 || Kitt Peak || Spacewatch || NYS || align=right | 2.0 km || 
|-id=705 bgcolor=#fefefe
| 46705 ||  || — || March 5, 1997 || Socorro || LINEAR || FLO || align=right | 1.6 km || 
|-id=706 bgcolor=#fefefe
| 46706 ||  || — || March 10, 1997 || Socorro || LINEAR || — || align=right | 1.8 km || 
|-id=707 bgcolor=#fefefe
| 46707 ||  || — || March 31, 1997 || Socorro || LINEAR || — || align=right | 2.4 km || 
|-id=708 bgcolor=#E9E9E9
| 46708 ||  || — || March 31, 1997 || Socorro || LINEAR || — || align=right | 2.3 km || 
|-id=709 bgcolor=#fefefe
| 46709 ||  || — || April 2, 1997 || Socorro || LINEAR || — || align=right | 3.1 km || 
|-id=710 bgcolor=#fefefe
| 46710 ||  || — || April 2, 1997 || Socorro || LINEAR || — || align=right | 3.8 km || 
|-id=711 bgcolor=#fefefe
| 46711 ||  || — || April 2, 1997 || Socorro || LINEAR || NYS || align=right | 2.0 km || 
|-id=712 bgcolor=#fefefe
| 46712 ||  || — || April 3, 1997 || Socorro || LINEAR || — || align=right | 2.9 km || 
|-id=713 bgcolor=#fefefe
| 46713 ||  || — || April 5, 1997 || Socorro || LINEAR || — || align=right | 2.3 km || 
|-id=714 bgcolor=#fefefe
| 46714 ||  || — || April 30, 1997 || Socorro || LINEAR || — || align=right | 2.1 km || 
|-id=715 bgcolor=#d6d6d6
| 46715 ||  || — || April 30, 1997 || Socorro || LINEAR || THM || align=right | 5.1 km || 
|-id=716 bgcolor=#E9E9E9
| 46716 || 1997 NX || — || July 3, 1997 || Dynic || A. Sugie || — || align=right | 2.6 km || 
|-id=717 bgcolor=#E9E9E9
| 46717 ||  || — || July 7, 1997 || Kitt Peak || Spacewatch || — || align=right | 7.8 km || 
|-id=718 bgcolor=#E9E9E9
| 46718 ||  || — || July 9, 1997 || Farra d'Isonzo || Farra d'Isonzo || — || align=right | 7.1 km || 
|-id=719 bgcolor=#E9E9E9
| 46719 Plantade || 1997 PJ ||  || August 1, 1997 || Pises || Pises Obs. || — || align=right | 5.7 km || 
|-id=720 bgcolor=#d6d6d6
| 46720 Pierostroppa ||  ||  || August 13, 1997 || San Marcello || L. Tesi, A. Boattini || — || align=right | 4.5 km || 
|-id=721 bgcolor=#d6d6d6
| 46721 ||  || — || August 30, 1997 || Caussols || ODAS || — || align=right | 6.3 km || 
|-id=722 bgcolor=#d6d6d6
| 46722 Ireneadler ||  ||  || September 2, 1997 || Ondřejov || P. Pravec, L. Kotková || — || align=right | 5.9 km || 
|-id=723 bgcolor=#d6d6d6
| 46723 ||  || — || September 5, 1997 || Prescott || P. G. Comba || — || align=right | 5.9 km || 
|-id=724 bgcolor=#d6d6d6
| 46724 ||  || — || September 23, 1997 || Kitt Peak || Spacewatch || — || align=right | 5.2 km || 
|-id=725 bgcolor=#d6d6d6
| 46725 ||  || — || September 28, 1997 || Kitt Peak || Spacewatch || EOS || align=right | 6.8 km || 
|-id=726 bgcolor=#d6d6d6
| 46726 ||  || — || September 27, 1997 || Kitt Peak || Spacewatch || — || align=right | 8.7 km || 
|-id=727 bgcolor=#d6d6d6
| 46727 Hidekimatsuyama ||  ||  || September 30, 1997 || Nanyo || T. Okuni || KOR || align=right | 4.8 km || 
|-id=728 bgcolor=#d6d6d6
| 46728 ||  || — || September 30, 1997 || Kitt Peak || Spacewatch || — || align=right | 5.9 km || 
|-id=729 bgcolor=#d6d6d6
| 46729 ||  || — || September 28, 1997 || Kitt Peak || Spacewatch || — || align=right | 6.5 km || 
|-id=730 bgcolor=#d6d6d6
| 46730 ||  || — || October 9, 1997 || Kleť || Kleť Obs. || — || align=right | 13 km || 
|-id=731 bgcolor=#d6d6d6
| 46731 Prieurblanc ||  ||  || October 4, 1997 || Hottviller || C. Demeautis, P. Buttani || EOS || align=right | 6.1 km || 
|-id=732 bgcolor=#d6d6d6
| 46732 ||  || — || October 8, 1997 || Uenohara || N. Kawasato || KOR || align=right | 4.0 km || 
|-id=733 bgcolor=#d6d6d6
| 46733 ||  || — || October 2, 1997 || Kitt Peak || Spacewatch || HYG || align=right | 6.2 km || 
|-id=734 bgcolor=#d6d6d6
| 46734 ||  || — || October 9, 1997 || Xinglong || SCAP || ALA || align=right | 7.7 km || 
|-id=735 bgcolor=#d6d6d6
| 46735 ||  || — || October 21, 1997 || Nachi-Katsuura || Y. Shimizu, T. Urata || EOS || align=right | 7.9 km || 
|-id=736 bgcolor=#d6d6d6
| 46736 ||  || — || October 31, 1997 || Xinglong || SCAP || HYG || align=right | 5.6 km || 
|-id=737 bgcolor=#d6d6d6
| 46737 Anpanman || 1997 VO ||  || November 1, 1997 || Kuma Kogen || A. Nakamura || THM || align=right | 8.1 km || 
|-id=738 bgcolor=#d6d6d6
| 46738 ||  || — || November 1, 1997 || Oohira || T. Urata || — || align=right | 6.4 km || 
|-id=739 bgcolor=#d6d6d6
| 46739 ||  || — || November 21, 1997 || Kitt Peak || Spacewatch || KOR || align=right | 3.5 km || 
|-id=740 bgcolor=#fefefe
| 46740 ||  || — || November 23, 1997 || Kitt Peak || Spacewatch || — || align=right | 2.0 km || 
|-id=741 bgcolor=#d6d6d6
| 46741 ||  || — || November 23, 1997 || Kitt Peak || Spacewatch || THM || align=right | 6.8 km || 
|-id=742 bgcolor=#d6d6d6
| 46742 ||  || — || November 23, 1997 || Kitt Peak || Spacewatch || HYG || align=right | 6.9 km || 
|-id=743 bgcolor=#d6d6d6
| 46743 ||  || — || November 29, 1997 || Socorro || LINEAR || HYG || align=right | 9.2 km || 
|-id=744 bgcolor=#d6d6d6
| 46744 ||  || — || November 29, 1997 || Socorro || LINEAR || — || align=right | 9.7 km || 
|-id=745 bgcolor=#d6d6d6
| 46745 ||  || — || November 26, 1997 || Socorro || LINEAR || — || align=right | 5.2 km || 
|-id=746 bgcolor=#E9E9E9
| 46746 ||  || — || January 28, 1998 || Oizumi || T. Kobayashi || — || align=right | 2.6 km || 
|-id=747 bgcolor=#fefefe
| 46747 ||  || — || February 22, 1998 || Haleakala || NEAT || FLO || align=right | 2.1 km || 
|-id=748 bgcolor=#fefefe
| 46748 ||  || — || February 27, 1998 || Caussols || ODAS || — || align=right | 1.7 km || 
|-id=749 bgcolor=#E9E9E9
| 46749 ||  || — || February 22, 1998 || Kitt Peak || Spacewatch || — || align=right | 4.7 km || 
|-id=750 bgcolor=#E9E9E9
| 46750 ||  || — || March 1, 1998 || La Silla || E. W. Elst || — || align=right | 4.5 km || 
|-id=751 bgcolor=#fefefe
| 46751 ||  || — || March 20, 1998 || Socorro || LINEAR || — || align=right | 2.7 km || 
|-id=752 bgcolor=#fefefe
| 46752 ||  || — || March 20, 1998 || Socorro || LINEAR || — || align=right | 4.6 km || 
|-id=753 bgcolor=#fefefe
| 46753 ||  || — || March 20, 1998 || Socorro || LINEAR || — || align=right | 1.7 km || 
|-id=754 bgcolor=#fefefe
| 46754 ||  || — || March 20, 1998 || Socorro || LINEAR || — || align=right | 1.5 km || 
|-id=755 bgcolor=#fefefe
| 46755 ||  || — || March 20, 1998 || Socorro || LINEAR || — || align=right | 2.8 km || 
|-id=756 bgcolor=#fefefe
| 46756 ||  || — || March 20, 1998 || Socorro || LINEAR || MAS || align=right | 2.2 km || 
|-id=757 bgcolor=#fefefe
| 46757 ||  || — || March 20, 1998 || Socorro || LINEAR || — || align=right | 2.4 km || 
|-id=758 bgcolor=#fefefe
| 46758 ||  || — || March 20, 1998 || Socorro || LINEAR || — || align=right | 1.8 km || 
|-id=759 bgcolor=#fefefe
| 46759 ||  || — || March 20, 1998 || Socorro || LINEAR || FLO || align=right | 2.6 km || 
|-id=760 bgcolor=#fefefe
| 46760 ||  || — || March 20, 1998 || Socorro || LINEAR || FLO || align=right | 2.5 km || 
|-id=761 bgcolor=#fefefe
| 46761 ||  || — || March 20, 1998 || Socorro || LINEAR || — || align=right | 2.1 km || 
|-id=762 bgcolor=#fefefe
| 46762 ||  || — || March 24, 1998 || Socorro || LINEAR || — || align=right | 2.8 km || 
|-id=763 bgcolor=#fefefe
| 46763 ||  || — || March 24, 1998 || Socorro || LINEAR || — || align=right | 6.4 km || 
|-id=764 bgcolor=#fefefe
| 46764 ||  || — || March 24, 1998 || Socorro || LINEAR || — || align=right | 1.8 km || 
|-id=765 bgcolor=#fefefe
| 46765 ||  || — || March 31, 1998 || Socorro || LINEAR || — || align=right | 2.9 km || 
|-id=766 bgcolor=#fefefe
| 46766 ||  || — || March 31, 1998 || Socorro || LINEAR || — || align=right | 1.8 km || 
|-id=767 bgcolor=#fefefe
| 46767 ||  || — || March 31, 1998 || Socorro || LINEAR || — || align=right | 3.3 km || 
|-id=768 bgcolor=#fefefe
| 46768 ||  || — || March 20, 1998 || Socorro || LINEAR || — || align=right | 1.6 km || 
|-id=769 bgcolor=#fefefe
| 46769 ||  || — || April 19, 1998 || Kitt Peak || Spacewatch || — || align=right | 1.9 km || 
|-id=770 bgcolor=#fefefe
| 46770 ||  || — || April 21, 1998 || Caussols || ODAS || — || align=right | 1.7 km || 
|-id=771 bgcolor=#FA8072
| 46771 ||  || — || April 23, 1998 || Socorro || LINEAR || PHO || align=right | 3.4 km || 
|-id=772 bgcolor=#fefefe
| 46772 ||  || — || April 21, 1998 || Bédoin || P. Antonini || FLO || align=right | 2.2 km || 
|-id=773 bgcolor=#FA8072
| 46773 ||  || — || April 18, 1998 || Socorro || LINEAR || — || align=right | 2.4 km || 
|-id=774 bgcolor=#fefefe
| 46774 ||  || — || April 20, 1998 || Socorro || LINEAR || — || align=right | 2.8 km || 
|-id=775 bgcolor=#fefefe
| 46775 ||  || — || April 24, 1998 || Kitt Peak || Spacewatch || FLO || align=right | 2.3 km || 
|-id=776 bgcolor=#fefefe
| 46776 ||  || — || April 24, 1998 || Kleť || Kleť Obs. || FLO || align=right | 2.3 km || 
|-id=777 bgcolor=#fefefe
| 46777 ||  || — || April 25, 1998 || Anderson Mesa || LONEOS || — || align=right | 2.2 km || 
|-id=778 bgcolor=#fefefe
| 46778 ||  || — || April 30, 1998 || Anderson Mesa || LONEOS || — || align=right | 2.2 km || 
|-id=779 bgcolor=#fefefe
| 46779 ||  || — || April 30, 1998 || Anderson Mesa || LONEOS || — || align=right | 2.1 km || 
|-id=780 bgcolor=#FA8072
| 46780 ||  || — || April 30, 1998 || Anderson Mesa || LONEOS || — || align=right | 3.6 km || 
|-id=781 bgcolor=#fefefe
| 46781 ||  || — || April 21, 1998 || Socorro || LINEAR || — || align=right | 1.5 km || 
|-id=782 bgcolor=#fefefe
| 46782 ||  || — || April 21, 1998 || Socorro || LINEAR || — || align=right | 2.5 km || 
|-id=783 bgcolor=#fefefe
| 46783 ||  || — || April 24, 1998 || Reedy Creek || J. Broughton || — || align=right | 1.9 km || 
|-id=784 bgcolor=#fefefe
| 46784 ||  || — || April 23, 1998 || Socorro || LINEAR || V || align=right | 1.6 km || 
|-id=785 bgcolor=#fefefe
| 46785 ||  || — || April 23, 1998 || Socorro || LINEAR || — || align=right | 2.2 km || 
|-id=786 bgcolor=#fefefe
| 46786 ||  || — || April 23, 1998 || Socorro || LINEAR || — || align=right | 2.2 km || 
|-id=787 bgcolor=#E9E9E9
| 46787 ||  || — || April 19, 1998 || Socorro || LINEAR || — || align=right | 4.9 km || 
|-id=788 bgcolor=#fefefe
| 46788 ||  || — || April 21, 1998 || Socorro || LINEAR || — || align=right | 2.3 km || 
|-id=789 bgcolor=#fefefe
| 46789 ||  || — || April 21, 1998 || Socorro || LINEAR || FLO || align=right | 1.8 km || 
|-id=790 bgcolor=#fefefe
| 46790 ||  || — || April 25, 1998 || La Silla || E. W. Elst || FLO || align=right | 2.4 km || 
|-id=791 bgcolor=#fefefe
| 46791 ||  || — || April 25, 1998 || La Silla || E. W. Elst || FLO || align=right | 2.6 km || 
|-id=792 bgcolor=#E9E9E9
| 46792 ||  || — || April 24, 1998 || Socorro || LINEAR || — || align=right | 6.0 km || 
|-id=793 bgcolor=#fefefe
| 46793 Phinney || 1998 JP ||  || May 1, 1998 || Haleakala || NEAT || FLO || align=right | 2.2 km || 
|-id=794 bgcolor=#fefefe
| 46794 ||  || — || May 1, 1998 || Anderson Mesa || LONEOS || — || align=right | 2.8 km || 
|-id=795 bgcolor=#fefefe
| 46795 ||  || — || May 1, 1998 || Socorro || LINEAR || — || align=right | 1.9 km || 
|-id=796 bgcolor=#fefefe
| 46796 Mamigasakigawa || 1998 KU ||  || May 19, 1998 || Nanyo || T. Okuni || V || align=right | 2.7 km || 
|-id=797 bgcolor=#fefefe
| 46797 ||  || — || May 22, 1998 || Anderson Mesa || LONEOS || — || align=right | 2.6 km || 
|-id=798 bgcolor=#fefefe
| 46798 ||  || — || May 22, 1998 || Anderson Mesa || LONEOS || V || align=right | 2.7 km || 
|-id=799 bgcolor=#fefefe
| 46799 ||  || — || May 23, 1998 || Anderson Mesa || LONEOS || — || align=right | 3.6 km || 
|-id=800 bgcolor=#fefefe
| 46800 ||  || — || May 22, 1998 || Socorro || LINEAR || — || align=right | 4.5 km || 
|}

46801–46900 

|-bgcolor=#fefefe
| 46801 ||  || — || May 22, 1998 || Socorro || LINEAR || — || align=right | 1.7 km || 
|-id=802 bgcolor=#fefefe
| 46802 ||  || — || May 22, 1998 || Socorro || LINEAR || — || align=right | 1.8 km || 
|-id=803 bgcolor=#fefefe
| 46803 ||  || — || May 22, 1998 || Socorro || LINEAR || FLO || align=right | 1.8 km || 
|-id=804 bgcolor=#fefefe
| 46804 ||  || — || May 22, 1998 || Socorro || LINEAR || FLO || align=right | 1.9 km || 
|-id=805 bgcolor=#fefefe
| 46805 ||  || — || May 22, 1998 || Socorro || LINEAR || — || align=right | 2.4 km || 
|-id=806 bgcolor=#fefefe
| 46806 ||  || — || May 22, 1998 || Socorro || LINEAR || — || align=right | 2.1 km || 
|-id=807 bgcolor=#fefefe
| 46807 ||  || — || May 22, 1998 || Socorro || LINEAR || — || align=right | 2.2 km || 
|-id=808 bgcolor=#fefefe
| 46808 ||  || — || May 22, 1998 || Socorro || LINEAR || — || align=right | 2.2 km || 
|-id=809 bgcolor=#fefefe
| 46809 ||  || — || May 22, 1998 || Socorro || LINEAR || FLO || align=right | 2.7 km || 
|-id=810 bgcolor=#fefefe
| 46810 ||  || — || May 22, 1998 || Socorro || LINEAR || FLO || align=right | 3.2 km || 
|-id=811 bgcolor=#fefefe
| 46811 ||  || — || May 22, 1998 || Socorro || LINEAR || FLO || align=right | 2.6 km || 
|-id=812 bgcolor=#fefefe
| 46812 ||  || — || May 22, 1998 || Socorro || LINEAR || FLO || align=right | 1.7 km || 
|-id=813 bgcolor=#fefefe
| 46813 ||  || — || May 22, 1998 || Socorro || LINEAR || — || align=right | 3.1 km || 
|-id=814 bgcolor=#fefefe
| 46814 ||  || — || May 22, 1998 || Socorro || LINEAR || — || align=right | 3.1 km || 
|-id=815 bgcolor=#fefefe
| 46815 ||  || — || June 21, 1998 || San Marcello || L. Tesi, A. Boattini || — || align=right | 2.2 km || 
|-id=816 bgcolor=#fefefe
| 46816 ||  || — || June 24, 1998 || Socorro || LINEAR || — || align=right | 4.3 km || 
|-id=817 bgcolor=#fefefe
| 46817 ||  || — || June 24, 1998 || Kitt Peak || Spacewatch || NYS || align=right | 1.4 km || 
|-id=818 bgcolor=#FA8072
| 46818 ||  || — || June 24, 1998 || Socorro || LINEAR || — || align=right | 4.3 km || 
|-id=819 bgcolor=#fefefe
| 46819 ||  || — || June 24, 1998 || Socorro || LINEAR || FLO || align=right | 3.3 km || 
|-id=820 bgcolor=#fefefe
| 46820 ||  || — || June 24, 1998 || Socorro || LINEAR || NYS || align=right | 1.8 km || 
|-id=821 bgcolor=#fefefe
| 46821 ||  || — || June 24, 1998 || Socorro || LINEAR || — || align=right | 3.9 km || 
|-id=822 bgcolor=#E9E9E9
| 46822 ||  || — || June 24, 1998 || Socorro || LINEAR || — || align=right | 4.5 km || 
|-id=823 bgcolor=#fefefe
| 46823 ||  || — || June 24, 1998 || Socorro || LINEAR || — || align=right | 3.1 km || 
|-id=824 bgcolor=#fefefe
| 46824 Tambora ||  ||  || June 26, 1998 || La Silla || E. W. Elst || V || align=right | 1.7 km || 
|-id=825 bgcolor=#fefefe
| 46825 ||  || — || July 25, 1998 || Prescott || P. G. Comba || — || align=right | 3.2 km || 
|-id=826 bgcolor=#fefefe
| 46826 ||  || — || July 28, 1998 || Xinglong || SCAP || — || align=right | 2.9 km || 
|-id=827 bgcolor=#fefefe
| 46827 ||  || — || July 28, 1998 || Xinglong || SCAP || V || align=right | 2.7 km || 
|-id=828 bgcolor=#fefefe
| 46828 ||  || — || July 26, 1998 || La Silla || E. W. Elst || V || align=right | 2.4 km || 
|-id=829 bgcolor=#fefefe
| 46829 McMahon ||  ||  || July 26, 1998 || La Silla || E. W. Elst || moon || align=right | 2.9 km || 
|-id=830 bgcolor=#fefefe
| 46830 || 1998 PU || — || August 15, 1998 || Prescott || P. G. Comba || — || align=right | 3.5 km || 
|-id=831 bgcolor=#fefefe
| 46831 || 1998 QH || — || August 17, 1998 || Prescott || P. G. Comba || — || align=right | 3.1 km || 
|-id=832 bgcolor=#fefefe
| 46832 ||  || — || August 17, 1998 || Višnjan Observatory || Višnjan Obs. || — || align=right | 5.5 km || 
|-id=833 bgcolor=#fefefe
| 46833 ||  || — || August 17, 1998 || Socorro || LINEAR || V || align=right | 2.0 km || 
|-id=834 bgcolor=#fefefe
| 46834 ||  || — || August 17, 1998 || Socorro || LINEAR || — || align=right | 2.4 km || 
|-id=835 bgcolor=#fefefe
| 46835 ||  || — || August 17, 1998 || Socorro || LINEAR || — || align=right | 2.6 km || 
|-id=836 bgcolor=#fefefe
| 46836 ||  || — || August 17, 1998 || Socorro || LINEAR || — || align=right | 3.4 km || 
|-id=837 bgcolor=#fefefe
| 46837 ||  || — || August 17, 1998 || Socorro || LINEAR || V || align=right | 2.4 km || 
|-id=838 bgcolor=#fefefe
| 46838 ||  || — || August 17, 1998 || Socorro || LINEAR || — || align=right | 2.2 km || 
|-id=839 bgcolor=#fefefe
| 46839 ||  || — || August 17, 1998 || Socorro || LINEAR || — || align=right | 2.5 km || 
|-id=840 bgcolor=#fefefe
| 46840 ||  || — || August 17, 1998 || Socorro || LINEAR || fast? || align=right | 3.4 km || 
|-id=841 bgcolor=#E9E9E9
| 46841 ||  || — || August 17, 1998 || Socorro || LINEAR || — || align=right | 2.4 km || 
|-id=842 bgcolor=#fefefe
| 46842 ||  || — || August 17, 1998 || Socorro || LINEAR || — || align=right | 2.5 km || 
|-id=843 bgcolor=#fefefe
| 46843 ||  || — || August 17, 1998 || Socorro || LINEAR || — || align=right | 2.9 km || 
|-id=844 bgcolor=#fefefe
| 46844 ||  || — || August 17, 1998 || Socorro || LINEAR || — || align=right | 2.7 km || 
|-id=845 bgcolor=#fefefe
| 46845 ||  || — || August 17, 1998 || Socorro || LINEAR || V || align=right | 2.5 km || 
|-id=846 bgcolor=#E9E9E9
| 46846 ||  || — || August 17, 1998 || Socorro || LINEAR || — || align=right | 2.3 km || 
|-id=847 bgcolor=#fefefe
| 46847 ||  || — || August 25, 1998 || Woomera || F. B. Zoltowski || NYS || align=right | 1.5 km || 
|-id=848 bgcolor=#fefefe
| 46848 ||  || — || August 17, 1998 || Socorro || LINEAR || NYS || align=right | 2.6 km || 
|-id=849 bgcolor=#E9E9E9
| 46849 ||  || — || August 17, 1998 || Socorro || LINEAR || — || align=right | 2.4 km || 
|-id=850 bgcolor=#E9E9E9
| 46850 ||  || — || August 17, 1998 || Socorro || LINEAR || — || align=right | 2.5 km || 
|-id=851 bgcolor=#fefefe
| 46851 ||  || — || August 17, 1998 || Socorro || LINEAR || NYS || align=right | 2.1 km || 
|-id=852 bgcolor=#E9E9E9
| 46852 ||  || — || August 17, 1998 || Socorro || LINEAR || — || align=right | 4.2 km || 
|-id=853 bgcolor=#fefefe
| 46853 ||  || — || August 17, 1998 || Socorro || LINEAR || — || align=right | 3.0 km || 
|-id=854 bgcolor=#fefefe
| 46854 ||  || — || August 17, 1998 || Socorro || LINEAR || — || align=right | 4.2 km || 
|-id=855 bgcolor=#fefefe
| 46855 ||  || — || August 17, 1998 || Socorro || LINEAR || — || align=right | 3.0 km || 
|-id=856 bgcolor=#fefefe
| 46856 ||  || — || August 17, 1998 || Socorro || LINEAR || — || align=right | 2.7 km || 
|-id=857 bgcolor=#fefefe
| 46857 ||  || — || August 17, 1998 || Socorro || LINEAR || — || align=right | 3.5 km || 
|-id=858 bgcolor=#fefefe
| 46858 ||  || — || August 17, 1998 || Socorro || LINEAR || — || align=right | 3.6 km || 
|-id=859 bgcolor=#fefefe
| 46859 ||  || — || August 17, 1998 || Socorro || LINEAR || — || align=right | 2.5 km || 
|-id=860 bgcolor=#fefefe
| 46860 ||  || — || August 27, 1998 || Ondřejov || L. Kotková || V || align=right | 2.2 km || 
|-id=861 bgcolor=#E9E9E9
| 46861 ||  || — || August 24, 1998 || Socorro || LINEAR || — || align=right | 3.8 km || 
|-id=862 bgcolor=#E9E9E9
| 46862 ||  || — || August 24, 1998 || Socorro || LINEAR || — || align=right | 3.7 km || 
|-id=863 bgcolor=#E9E9E9
| 46863 ||  || — || August 24, 1998 || Socorro || LINEAR || — || align=right | 4.2 km || 
|-id=864 bgcolor=#E9E9E9
| 46864 ||  || — || August 24, 1998 || Socorro || LINEAR || — || align=right | 5.1 km || 
|-id=865 bgcolor=#fefefe
| 46865 ||  || — || August 24, 1998 || Socorro || LINEAR || — || align=right | 2.3 km || 
|-id=866 bgcolor=#E9E9E9
| 46866 ||  || — || August 24, 1998 || Socorro || LINEAR || — || align=right | 2.6 km || 
|-id=867 bgcolor=#E9E9E9
| 46867 ||  || — || August 28, 1998 || Socorro || LINEAR || — || align=right | 8.6 km || 
|-id=868 bgcolor=#E9E9E9
| 46868 ||  || — || August 28, 1998 || Socorro || LINEAR || — || align=right | 4.3 km || 
|-id=869 bgcolor=#fefefe
| 46869 ||  || — || August 23, 1998 || Socorro || LINEAR || — || align=right | 2.4 km || 
|-id=870 bgcolor=#fefefe
| 46870 ||  || — || August 26, 1998 || La Silla || E. W. Elst || — || align=right | 3.1 km || 
|-id=871 bgcolor=#E9E9E9
| 46871 ||  || — || August 26, 1998 || La Silla || E. W. Elst || ADE || align=right | 7.0 km || 
|-id=872 bgcolor=#E9E9E9
| 46872 ||  || — || August 26, 1998 || La Silla || E. W. Elst || — || align=right | 4.1 km || 
|-id=873 bgcolor=#E9E9E9
| 46873 ||  || — || August 26, 1998 || La Silla || E. W. Elst || — || align=right | 5.4 km || 
|-id=874 bgcolor=#E9E9E9
| 46874 ||  || — || August 26, 1998 || La Silla || E. W. Elst || — || align=right | 4.4 km || 
|-id=875 bgcolor=#E9E9E9
| 46875 ||  || — || August 26, 1998 || La Silla || E. W. Elst || — || align=right | 4.5 km || 
|-id=876 bgcolor=#E9E9E9
| 46876 ||  || — || August 26, 1998 || La Silla || E. W. Elst || — || align=right | 4.2 km || 
|-id=877 bgcolor=#fefefe
| 46877 || 1998 RU || — || September 12, 1998 || Prescott || P. G. Comba || V || align=right | 1.6 km || 
|-id=878 bgcolor=#E9E9E9
| 46878 ||  || — || September 14, 1998 || Socorro || LINEAR || — || align=right | 3.5 km || 
|-id=879 bgcolor=#fefefe
| 46879 ||  || — || September 14, 1998 || Socorro || LINEAR || H || align=right | 1.8 km || 
|-id=880 bgcolor=#E9E9E9
| 46880 ||  || — || September 15, 1998 || Višnjan Observatory || Višnjan Obs. || — || align=right | 3.0 km || 
|-id=881 bgcolor=#E9E9E9
| 46881 ||  || — || September 15, 1998 || Anderson Mesa || LONEOS || — || align=right | 2.9 km || 
|-id=882 bgcolor=#fefefe
| 46882 ||  || — || September 13, 1998 || Kitt Peak || Spacewatch || — || align=right | 2.3 km || 
|-id=883 bgcolor=#E9E9E9
| 46883 ||  || — || September 1, 1998 || Xinglong || SCAP || — || align=right | 3.0 km || 
|-id=884 bgcolor=#fefefe
| 46884 ||  || — || September 14, 1998 || Socorro || LINEAR || NYS || align=right | 2.3 km || 
|-id=885 bgcolor=#E9E9E9
| 46885 ||  || — || September 14, 1998 || Socorro || LINEAR || — || align=right | 2.3 km || 
|-id=886 bgcolor=#E9E9E9
| 46886 ||  || — || September 14, 1998 || Socorro || LINEAR || — || align=right | 2.3 km || 
|-id=887 bgcolor=#E9E9E9
| 46887 ||  || — || September 14, 1998 || Socorro || LINEAR || — || align=right | 3.9 km || 
|-id=888 bgcolor=#fefefe
| 46888 ||  || — || September 14, 1998 || Socorro || LINEAR || — || align=right | 3.3 km || 
|-id=889 bgcolor=#E9E9E9
| 46889 ||  || — || September 14, 1998 || Socorro || LINEAR || — || align=right | 4.9 km || 
|-id=890 bgcolor=#E9E9E9
| 46890 ||  || — || September 14, 1998 || Socorro || LINEAR || — || align=right | 2.8 km || 
|-id=891 bgcolor=#E9E9E9
| 46891 ||  || — || September 14, 1998 || Socorro || LINEAR || — || align=right | 3.3 km || 
|-id=892 bgcolor=#E9E9E9
| 46892 ||  || — || September 14, 1998 || Socorro || LINEAR || — || align=right | 4.8 km || 
|-id=893 bgcolor=#E9E9E9
| 46893 ||  || — || September 14, 1998 || Socorro || LINEAR || — || align=right | 3.1 km || 
|-id=894 bgcolor=#E9E9E9
| 46894 ||  || — || September 14, 1998 || Socorro || LINEAR || — || align=right | 4.5 km || 
|-id=895 bgcolor=#E9E9E9
| 46895 ||  || — || September 14, 1998 || Socorro || LINEAR || — || align=right | 2.3 km || 
|-id=896 bgcolor=#E9E9E9
| 46896 ||  || — || September 14, 1998 || Socorro || LINEAR || — || align=right | 2.8 km || 
|-id=897 bgcolor=#E9E9E9
| 46897 ||  || — || September 14, 1998 || Socorro || LINEAR || — || align=right | 3.1 km || 
|-id=898 bgcolor=#E9E9E9
| 46898 ||  || — || September 14, 1998 || Socorro || LINEAR || — || align=right | 2.4 km || 
|-id=899 bgcolor=#E9E9E9
| 46899 ||  || — || September 14, 1998 || Socorro || LINEAR || — || align=right | 3.6 km || 
|-id=900 bgcolor=#E9E9E9
| 46900 ||  || — || September 14, 1998 || Socorro || LINEAR || — || align=right | 2.0 km || 
|}

46901–47000 

|-bgcolor=#E9E9E9
| 46901 ||  || — || September 14, 1998 || Socorro || LINEAR || PAD || align=right | 5.5 km || 
|-id=902 bgcolor=#E9E9E9
| 46902 ||  || — || September 14, 1998 || Socorro || LINEAR || EUN || align=right | 4.0 km || 
|-id=903 bgcolor=#E9E9E9
| 46903 ||  || — || September 14, 1998 || Socorro || LINEAR || — || align=right | 3.3 km || 
|-id=904 bgcolor=#E9E9E9
| 46904 ||  || — || September 14, 1998 || Socorro || LINEAR || — || align=right | 3.5 km || 
|-id=905 bgcolor=#E9E9E9
| 46905 ||  || — || September 14, 1998 || Socorro || LINEAR || — || align=right | 3.7 km || 
|-id=906 bgcolor=#E9E9E9
| 46906 ||  || — || September 14, 1998 || Socorro || LINEAR || — || align=right | 2.8 km || 
|-id=907 bgcolor=#E9E9E9
| 46907 ||  || — || September 14, 1998 || Socorro || LINEAR || ADE || align=right | 7.2 km || 
|-id=908 bgcolor=#E9E9E9
| 46908 ||  || — || September 14, 1998 || Socorro || LINEAR || — || align=right | 2.9 km || 
|-id=909 bgcolor=#E9E9E9
| 46909 ||  || — || September 14, 1998 || Socorro || LINEAR || MAR || align=right | 4.1 km || 
|-id=910 bgcolor=#E9E9E9
| 46910 ||  || — || September 14, 1998 || Socorro || LINEAR || — || align=right | 2.1 km || 
|-id=911 bgcolor=#E9E9E9
| 46911 ||  || — || September 14, 1998 || Socorro || LINEAR || — || align=right | 1.9 km || 
|-id=912 bgcolor=#E9E9E9
| 46912 ||  || — || September 14, 1998 || Socorro || LINEAR || — || align=right | 4.4 km || 
|-id=913 bgcolor=#E9E9E9
| 46913 ||  || — || September 14, 1998 || Socorro || LINEAR || — || align=right | 5.8 km || 
|-id=914 bgcolor=#E9E9E9
| 46914 ||  || — || September 14, 1998 || Socorro || LINEAR || MIS || align=right | 6.4 km || 
|-id=915 bgcolor=#E9E9E9
| 46915 ||  || — || September 14, 1998 || Socorro || LINEAR || — || align=right | 6.3 km || 
|-id=916 bgcolor=#E9E9E9
| 46916 ||  || — || September 14, 1998 || Socorro || LINEAR || — || align=right | 2.3 km || 
|-id=917 bgcolor=#E9E9E9
| 46917 || 1998 SA || — || September 16, 1998 || Caussols || ODAS || — || align=right | 2.7 km || 
|-id=918 bgcolor=#E9E9E9
| 46918 || 1998 SC || — || September 16, 1998 || Woomera || F. B. Zoltowski || CLO || align=right | 9.4 km || 
|-id=919 bgcolor=#E9E9E9
| 46919 ||  || — || September 17, 1998 || Caussols || ODAS || MRX || align=right | 2.8 km || 
|-id=920 bgcolor=#E9E9E9
| 46920 Suzanedwards ||  ||  || September 23, 1998 || Catalina || CSS || — || align=right | 7.0 km || 
|-id=921 bgcolor=#d6d6d6
| 46921 ||  || — || September 16, 1998 || Anderson Mesa || LONEOS || — || align=right | 7.2 km || 
|-id=922 bgcolor=#fefefe
| 46922 ||  || — || September 20, 1998 || Kitt Peak || Spacewatch || NYS || align=right | 2.4 km || 
|-id=923 bgcolor=#fefefe
| 46923 ||  || — || September 17, 1998 || Anderson Mesa || LONEOS || — || align=right | 3.4 km || 
|-id=924 bgcolor=#E9E9E9
| 46924 ||  || — || September 24, 1998 || Kleť || Kleť Obs. || — || align=right | 1.7 km || 
|-id=925 bgcolor=#E9E9E9
| 46925 ||  || — || September 25, 1998 || Catalina || CSS || BRU || align=right | 16 km || 
|-id=926 bgcolor=#E9E9E9
| 46926 ||  || — || September 26, 1998 || Socorro || LINEAR || — || align=right | 4.4 km || 
|-id=927 bgcolor=#E9E9E9
| 46927 ||  || — || September 16, 1998 || Anderson Mesa || LONEOS || — || align=right | 2.4 km || 
|-id=928 bgcolor=#E9E9E9
| 46928 ||  || — || September 17, 1998 || Anderson Mesa || LONEOS || EUN || align=right | 4.0 km || 
|-id=929 bgcolor=#E9E9E9
| 46929 ||  || — || September 17, 1998 || Anderson Mesa || LONEOS || — || align=right | 3.1 km || 
|-id=930 bgcolor=#E9E9E9
| 46930 ||  || — || September 17, 1998 || Anderson Mesa || LONEOS || — || align=right | 4.6 km || 
|-id=931 bgcolor=#E9E9E9
| 46931 ||  || — || September 17, 1998 || Anderson Mesa || LONEOS || — || align=right | 1.8 km || 
|-id=932 bgcolor=#E9E9E9
| 46932 ||  || — || September 17, 1998 || Anderson Mesa || LONEOS || — || align=right | 2.3 km || 
|-id=933 bgcolor=#E9E9E9
| 46933 ||  || — || September 20, 1998 || Xinglong || SCAP || PAD || align=right | 6.0 km || 
|-id=934 bgcolor=#E9E9E9
| 46934 ||  || — || September 29, 1998 || Xinglong || SCAP || — || align=right | 2.5 km || 
|-id=935 bgcolor=#fefefe
| 46935 ||  || — || September 20, 1998 || La Silla || E. W. Elst || — || align=right | 3.7 km || 
|-id=936 bgcolor=#E9E9E9
| 46936 ||  || — || September 20, 1998 || La Silla || E. W. Elst || — || align=right | 7.7 km || 
|-id=937 bgcolor=#E9E9E9
| 46937 ||  || — || September 21, 1998 || La Silla || E. W. Elst || — || align=right | 3.7 km || 
|-id=938 bgcolor=#E9E9E9
| 46938 ||  || — || September 21, 1998 || La Silla || E. W. Elst || — || align=right | 4.1 km || 
|-id=939 bgcolor=#E9E9E9
| 46939 ||  || — || September 21, 1998 || La Silla || E. W. Elst || MRX || align=right | 3.1 km || 
|-id=940 bgcolor=#E9E9E9
| 46940 ||  || — || September 21, 1998 || La Silla || E. W. Elst || — || align=right | 4.9 km || 
|-id=941 bgcolor=#E9E9E9
| 46941 ||  || — || September 21, 1998 || La Silla || E. W. Elst || — || align=right | 4.2 km || 
|-id=942 bgcolor=#E9E9E9
| 46942 ||  || — || September 21, 1998 || La Silla || E. W. Elst || MIS || align=right | 4.8 km || 
|-id=943 bgcolor=#E9E9E9
| 46943 ||  || — || September 26, 1998 || Socorro || LINEAR || EUN || align=right | 3.5 km || 
|-id=944 bgcolor=#E9E9E9
| 46944 ||  || — || September 26, 1998 || Socorro || LINEAR || — || align=right | 9.2 km || 
|-id=945 bgcolor=#E9E9E9
| 46945 ||  || — || September 26, 1998 || Socorro || LINEAR || WIT || align=right | 3.0 km || 
|-id=946 bgcolor=#E9E9E9
| 46946 ||  || — || September 26, 1998 || Socorro || LINEAR || — || align=right | 4.7 km || 
|-id=947 bgcolor=#E9E9E9
| 46947 ||  || — || September 26, 1998 || Socorro || LINEAR || RAF || align=right | 2.1 km || 
|-id=948 bgcolor=#E9E9E9
| 46948 ||  || — || September 26, 1998 || Socorro || LINEAR || — || align=right | 3.7 km || 
|-id=949 bgcolor=#E9E9E9
| 46949 ||  || — || September 26, 1998 || Socorro || LINEAR || — || align=right | 4.2 km || 
|-id=950 bgcolor=#E9E9E9
| 46950 ||  || — || September 26, 1998 || Socorro || LINEAR || — || align=right | 7.5 km || 
|-id=951 bgcolor=#E9E9E9
| 46951 ||  || — || September 26, 1998 || Socorro || LINEAR || — || align=right | 3.2 km || 
|-id=952 bgcolor=#E9E9E9
| 46952 ||  || — || September 26, 1998 || Socorro || LINEAR || — || align=right | 1.9 km || 
|-id=953 bgcolor=#E9E9E9
| 46953 ||  || — || September 26, 1998 || Socorro || LINEAR || — || align=right | 6.3 km || 
|-id=954 bgcolor=#E9E9E9
| 46954 ||  || — || September 26, 1998 || Socorro || LINEAR || — || align=right | 6.6 km || 
|-id=955 bgcolor=#E9E9E9
| 46955 ||  || — || September 26, 1998 || Socorro || LINEAR || NEM || align=right | 5.3 km || 
|-id=956 bgcolor=#E9E9E9
| 46956 ||  || — || September 26, 1998 || Socorro || LINEAR || — || align=right | 3.2 km || 
|-id=957 bgcolor=#E9E9E9
| 46957 ||  || — || September 26, 1998 || Socorro || LINEAR || — || align=right | 3.2 km || 
|-id=958 bgcolor=#E9E9E9
| 46958 ||  || — || September 26, 1998 || Socorro || LINEAR || HEN || align=right | 3.1 km || 
|-id=959 bgcolor=#E9E9E9
| 46959 ||  || — || September 26, 1998 || Socorro || LINEAR || EUN || align=right | 4.9 km || 
|-id=960 bgcolor=#E9E9E9
| 46960 ||  || — || September 26, 1998 || Socorro || LINEAR || — || align=right | 3.9 km || 
|-id=961 bgcolor=#fefefe
| 46961 ||  || — || September 26, 1998 || Socorro || LINEAR || — || align=right | 2.1 km || 
|-id=962 bgcolor=#E9E9E9
| 46962 ||  || — || September 26, 1998 || Socorro || LINEAR || — || align=right | 2.8 km || 
|-id=963 bgcolor=#E9E9E9
| 46963 ||  || — || September 26, 1998 || Socorro || LINEAR || — || align=right | 5.8 km || 
|-id=964 bgcolor=#E9E9E9
| 46964 ||  || — || September 26, 1998 || Socorro || LINEAR || — || align=right | 5.1 km || 
|-id=965 bgcolor=#fefefe
| 46965 ||  || — || September 26, 1998 || Socorro || LINEAR || — || align=right | 6.0 km || 
|-id=966 bgcolor=#fefefe
| 46966 ||  || — || September 26, 1998 || Socorro || LINEAR || — || align=right | 3.1 km || 
|-id=967 bgcolor=#fefefe
| 46967 ||  || — || September 26, 1998 || Socorro || LINEAR || — || align=right | 5.9 km || 
|-id=968 bgcolor=#E9E9E9
| 46968 ||  || — || September 26, 1998 || Socorro || LINEAR || — || align=right | 2.9 km || 
|-id=969 bgcolor=#E9E9E9
| 46969 ||  || — || September 26, 1998 || Socorro || LINEAR || — || align=right | 5.4 km || 
|-id=970 bgcolor=#E9E9E9
| 46970 ||  || — || September 26, 1998 || Socorro || LINEAR || — || align=right | 4.1 km || 
|-id=971 bgcolor=#E9E9E9
| 46971 ||  || — || September 26, 1998 || Socorro || LINEAR || — || align=right | 6.9 km || 
|-id=972 bgcolor=#E9E9E9
| 46972 ||  || — || September 26, 1998 || Socorro || LINEAR || — || align=right | 3.9 km || 
|-id=973 bgcolor=#E9E9E9
| 46973 ||  || — || September 26, 1998 || Socorro || LINEAR || — || align=right | 4.5 km || 
|-id=974 bgcolor=#E9E9E9
| 46974 ||  || — || September 26, 1998 || Socorro || LINEAR || EUN || align=right | 2.9 km || 
|-id=975 bgcolor=#E9E9E9
| 46975 ||  || — || September 26, 1998 || Socorro || LINEAR || — || align=right | 3.6 km || 
|-id=976 bgcolor=#E9E9E9
| 46976 ||  || — || September 26, 1998 || Socorro || LINEAR || — || align=right | 3.5 km || 
|-id=977 bgcolor=#E9E9E9
| 46977 Krakow ||  ||  || September 18, 1998 || La Silla || E. W. Elst || — || align=right | 6.0 km || 
|-id=978 bgcolor=#E9E9E9
| 46978 ||  || — || September 20, 1998 || La Silla || E. W. Elst || — || align=right | 4.5 km || 
|-id=979 bgcolor=#E9E9E9
| 46979 ||  || — || September 26, 1998 || Socorro || LINEAR || — || align=right | 5.3 km || 
|-id=980 bgcolor=#E9E9E9
| 46980 ||  || — || September 26, 1998 || Socorro || LINEAR || — || align=right | 3.4 km || 
|-id=981 bgcolor=#E9E9E9
| 46981 ||  || — || September 26, 1998 || Socorro || LINEAR || AGN || align=right | 3.5 km || 
|-id=982 bgcolor=#E9E9E9
| 46982 ||  || — || September 26, 1998 || Socorro || LINEAR || — || align=right | 4.7 km || 
|-id=983 bgcolor=#E9E9E9
| 46983 ||  || — || September 26, 1998 || Socorro || LINEAR || — || align=right | 2.7 km || 
|-id=984 bgcolor=#E9E9E9
| 46984 ||  || — || September 26, 1998 || Socorro || LINEAR || HEN || align=right | 2.7 km || 
|-id=985 bgcolor=#E9E9E9
| 46985 ||  || — || September 26, 1998 || Socorro || LINEAR || — || align=right | 3.8 km || 
|-id=986 bgcolor=#E9E9E9
| 46986 ||  || — || September 18, 1998 || La Silla || E. W. Elst || — || align=right | 1.8 km || 
|-id=987 bgcolor=#E9E9E9
| 46987 ||  || — || September 25, 1998 || Anderson Mesa || LONEOS || — || align=right | 6.5 km || 
|-id=988 bgcolor=#E9E9E9
| 46988 ||  || — || October 13, 1998 || Višnjan Observatory || K. Korlević || — || align=right | 3.4 km || 
|-id=989 bgcolor=#E9E9E9
| 46989 ||  || — || October 13, 1998 || Višnjan Observatory || K. Korlević || ADE || align=right | 7.9 km || 
|-id=990 bgcolor=#E9E9E9
| 46990 ||  || — || October 15, 1998 || Reedy Creek || J. Broughton || — || align=right | 6.5 km || 
|-id=991 bgcolor=#E9E9E9
| 46991 ||  || — || October 14, 1998 || Caussols || ODAS || — || align=right | 1.2 km || 
|-id=992 bgcolor=#E9E9E9
| 46992 ||  || — || October 12, 1998 || Kushiro || S. Ueda, H. Kaneda || — || align=right | 8.5 km || 
|-id=993 bgcolor=#E9E9E9
| 46993 ||  || — || October 13, 1998 || Xinglong || SCAP || — || align=right | 3.1 km || 
|-id=994 bgcolor=#E9E9E9
| 46994 ||  || — || October 14, 1998 || Kitt Peak || Spacewatch || — || align=right | 4.3 km || 
|-id=995 bgcolor=#E9E9E9
| 46995 ||  || — || October 15, 1998 || Kitt Peak || Spacewatch || — || align=right | 3.0 km || 
|-id=996 bgcolor=#E9E9E9
| 46996 ||  || — || October 15, 1998 || Kitt Peak || Spacewatch || — || align=right | 5.3 km || 
|-id=997 bgcolor=#d6d6d6
| 46997 ||  || — || October 15, 1998 || Kitt Peak || Spacewatch || — || align=right | 5.0 km || 
|-id=998 bgcolor=#E9E9E9
| 46998 ||  || — || October 10, 1998 || Anderson Mesa || LONEOS || — || align=right | 2.8 km || 
|-id=999 bgcolor=#E9E9E9
| 46999 ||  || — || October 11, 1998 || Anderson Mesa || LONEOS || — || align=right | 5.5 km || 
|-id=000 bgcolor=#E9E9E9
| 47000 ||  || — || October 11, 1998 || Anderson Mesa || LONEOS || — || align=right | 6.4 km || 
|}

References

External links 
 Discovery Circumstances: Numbered Minor Planets (45001)–(50000) (IAU Minor Planet Center)

0046